= Carnot heat engine =

Theoretical engine

Axial cross section of Carnot's heat engine. In this diagram, abhg is a cylindrical vessel, cd is a movable piston, and A and B are constant–temperature bodies. The vessel may be placed in contact with either body or removed from both (as it is here).

A Carnot heat engine (English: /kɑːrˈnoʊ/ kar-NOH, French: [kaʁno]) is a theoretical heat engine that operates on the Carnot cycle. The basic model for this engine was developed by French military engineer Nicolas Léonard Sadi Carnot in 1824. The Carnot engine model was graphically expanded by Benoît Paul Émile Clapeyron in 1834 and mathematically explored by Rudolf Clausius in 1857, work that led to the fundamental thermodynamic concept of entropy. The Carnot engine is the most efficient heat engine which is theoretically possible. The efficiency depends only upon the absolute temperatures of the hot and cold heat reservoirs between which it operates.

A heat engine acts by transferring energy from a warm region to a cool region of space and, in the process, converting some of that energy to mechanical work. The cycle may also be reversed. The system may be worked upon by an external force, and in the process, it can transfer thermal energy from a cooler system to a warmer one, thereby acting as a refrigerator or heat pump rather than a heat engine.

Every thermodynamic system exists in a particular state. A thermodynamic cycle occurs when a system is taken through a series of different states, and finally returned to its initial state. In the process of going through this cycle, the system may perform work on its surroundings, thereby acting as a heat engine.

The Carnot engine is a theoretical construct, useful for exploring the efficiency limits of other heat engines. An actual Carnot engine, however, would be completely impractical to build.

== History and context ==
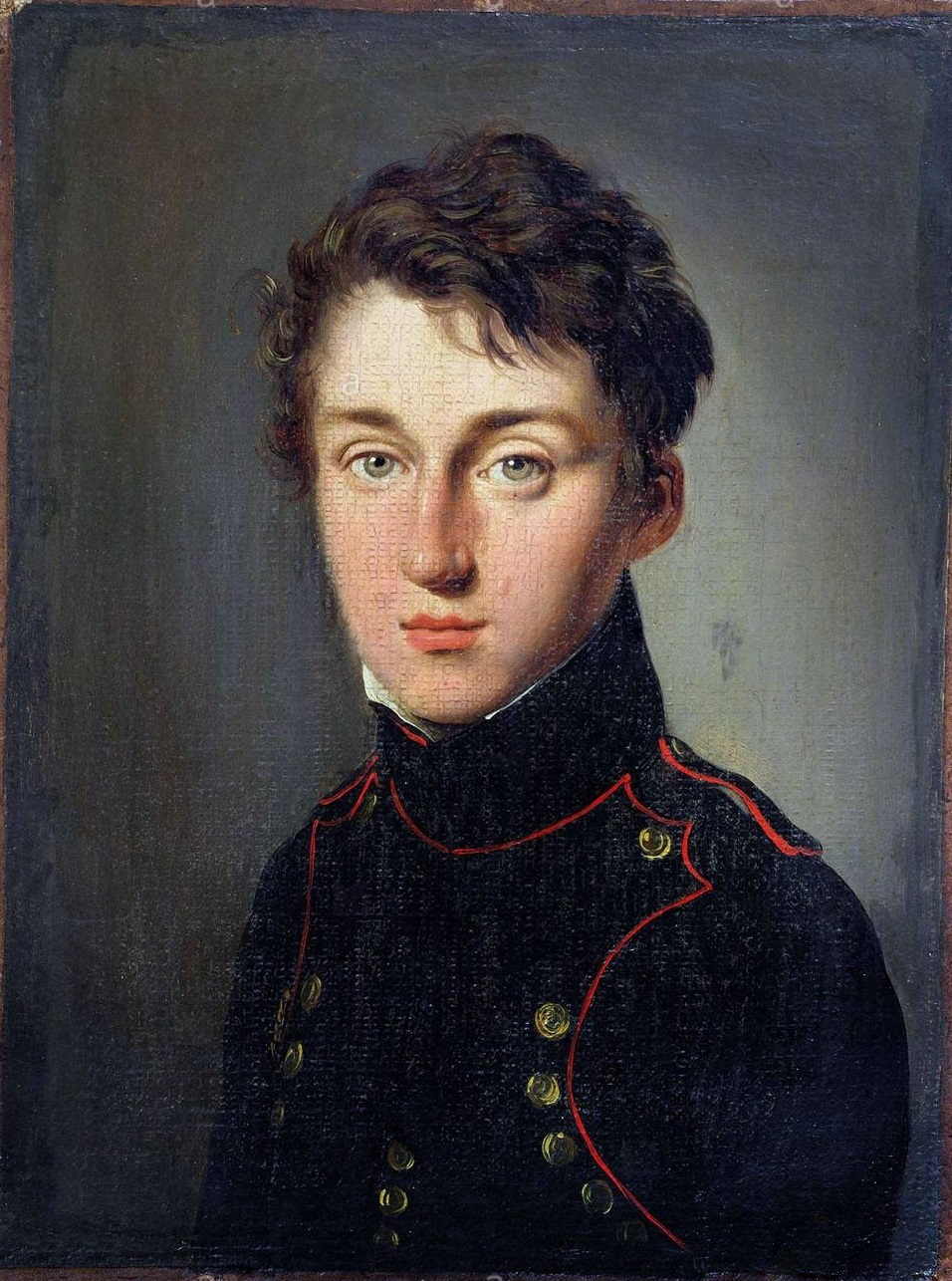
Sadi Carnot c. 1813 as a student at the École polytechnique, Paris (Louis-Léopold Boilly, private collection)

The Carnot engine was publicized in Sadi Carnot's sole work: Reflections on the Motive Power of Fire (1824). A short book addressed to practical engineers in popular language, it has been described as "remarkably accessible to modern readers"; "very clearly written ... [the] mathematical arguments are consigned to footnotes". It is known that Carnot was anxious to be understood by non-specialists.

Carnot's motivation was practical. "The purpose of Reflexions was to bring to public notice the potential of the steam engine for improving the standard of living in France".

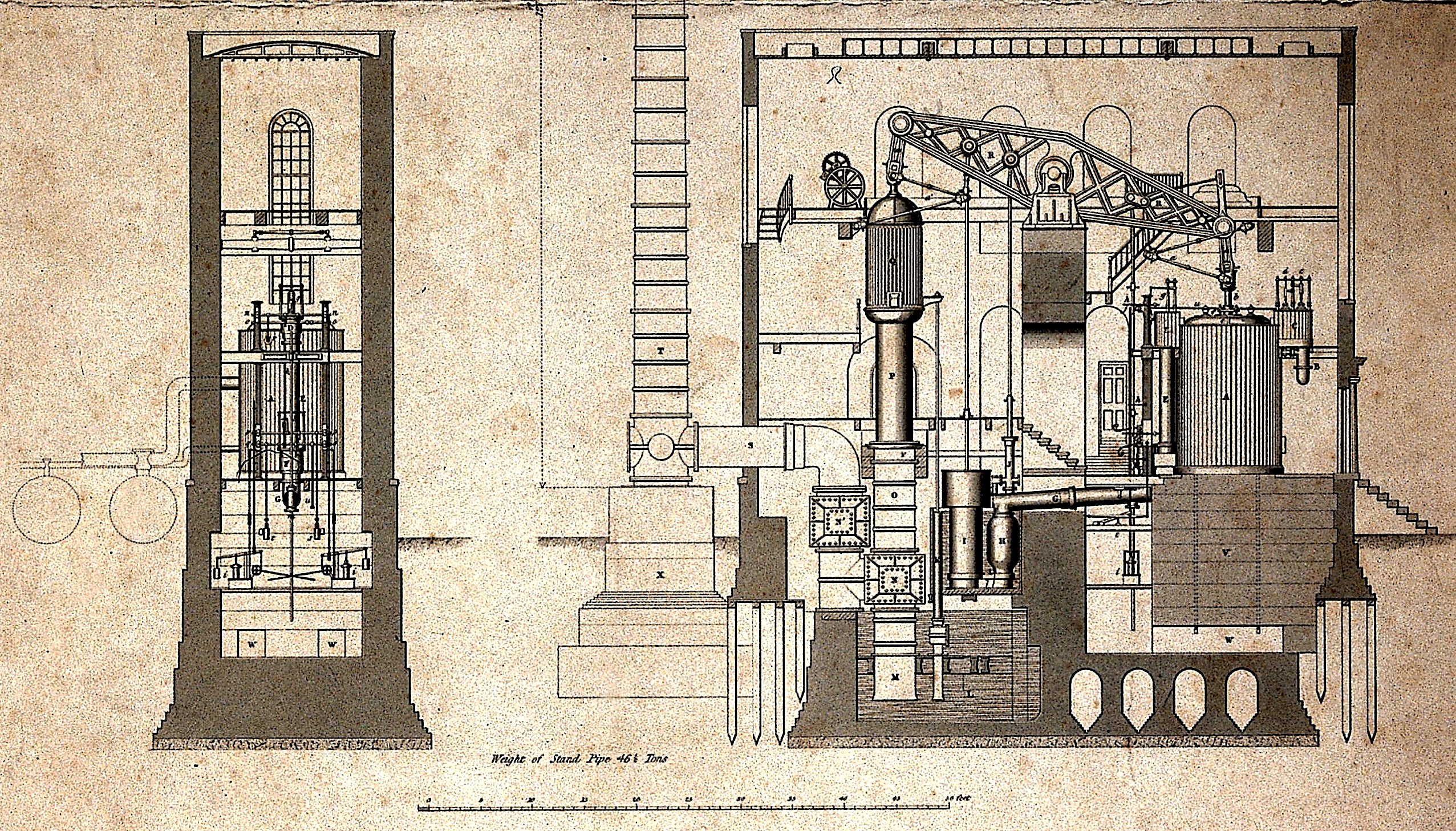
Cornish steam engines, famous for their efficiency, were avidly studied in France where fuel was expensive (Wellcome Collection).

The first useful steam engines were developed in Britain and were typically employed for pumping water out of coal mines. Since an engine could burn the mine's own coal (including waste coal, which had no commercial value) fuel economy was of little concern. The incentive to have efficient engines arose in parts of the country where fuel was costly, such as Cornwall.

The mines of Cornwall produced useful metals like tin; but not coal. The fuel to power their pumping engines had to be imported by sea and was expensive; users were keenly aware that "heat cost money". They sought the engine that did the best "duty'", measured in millions of pounds of water lifted one foot high per bushel of coal burnt. A practical business measure, it was a crude indication of the thermodynamic efficiency of an engine.

Cornish engineers were famous for the efficiency of their engines and their achievements were studied avidly, not least in France, where coal was expensive too. Sadi Carnot's book mentioned three of them by name, Richard Trevithick, Arthur Woolf and Jonathan Hornblower. Such men developed the Cornish engine in which high pressure steam was cut off early when the piston was at the beginning of its stroke, letting the steam's expansion complete the stroke by itself. Today it might be called adiabatic expansion.

Their ideas were enthusiastically taken up in France, where additionally, scientists and engineers were interested in the theory of steam and other engines.

== Significance ==
Carnot meant his ground-breaking theory to be easy for non-specialists to understand. As taught, it causes students much trouble.

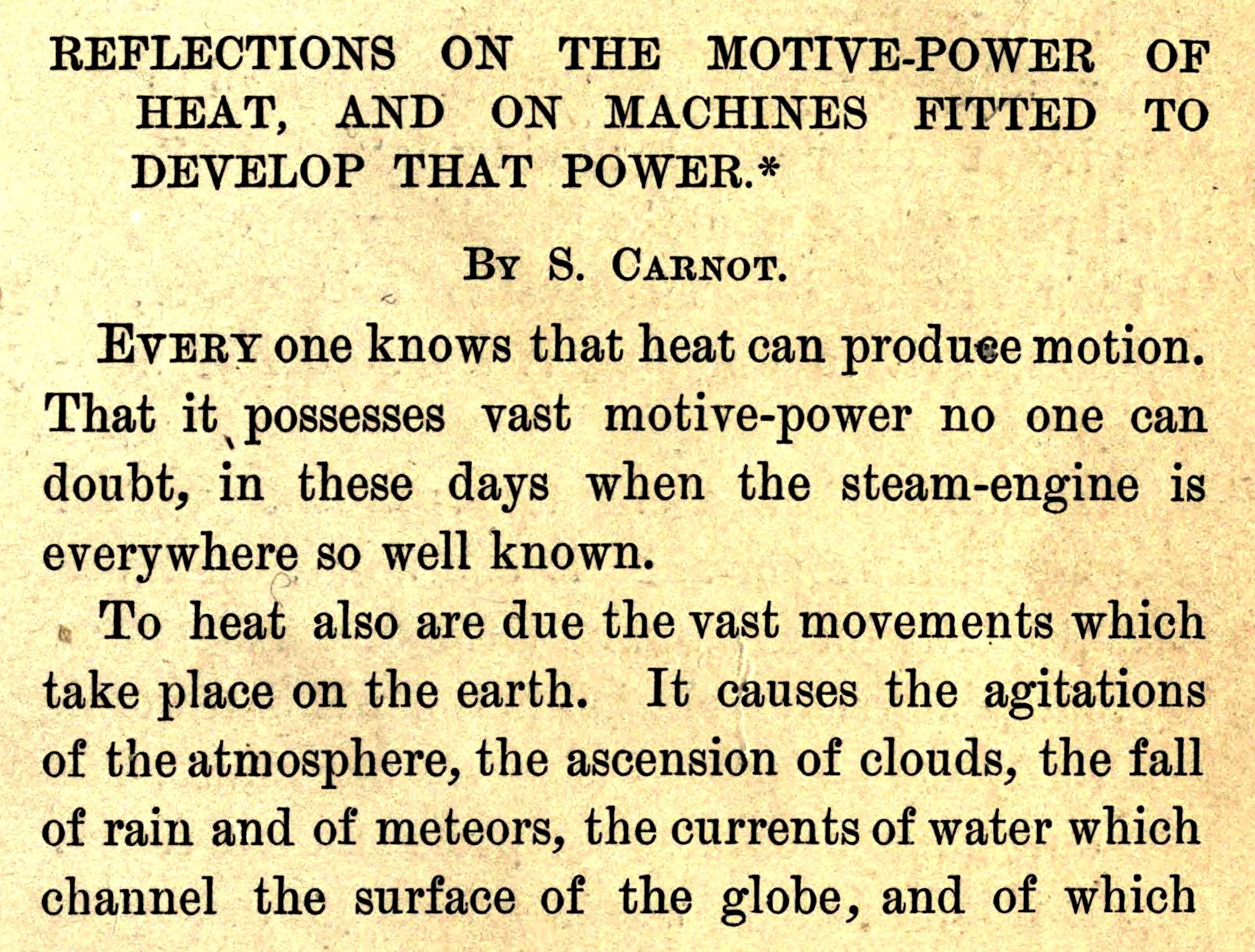
The opening page of Sadi Carnot's book (Thurston translation)

=== Importance ===
Carnot's innovation has been described as "real genius" and "one of the greatest intellectual achievements of the human mind". For Nobel laureate Richard Feynman

The science of thermodynamics began with an analysis, by the great engineer Sadi Carnot, of the problem of how to build the best and most efficient engine.

In particular it led to the discovery of the Second Law, of which it has been claimed that "Not knowing the Second Law of Thermodynamics is equivalent to never having read a work by Shakespeare".

=== Clarity ===
Sadi Carnot died young and published only one work: Reflections on the Motive Power of Fire (1824). A short book addressed to practical engineers in popular language, it has been described as "remarkably accessible to modern readers"; "very clearly written ... [the] mathematical arguments are consigned to footnotes". It is known that Carnot was anxious to be understood by non-specialists. Yet, in many university courses the Carnot cycle it is introduced in such an abstract way that students have trouble intuiting his ideas, and their implications.

Not all approve of his popular exposition. In The Tragicomical History of Thermodynamics 1822-1854 Clifford Truesdell strongly criticised Carnot for his lack of mathematical rigour, which (he said) has affected the discipline ever since.

=== Flaw in theory, and rescue ===
Carnot's theory as published contains a serious flaw, which he increasingly came to suspect himself. Like many scientists of his time he had assumed heat was an actual substance (they called it caloric). This is an intuitive way to think about heat and it has been shown that children think similarly.

After Carnot's death new data led to a fundamental shift in scientific thinking. Heat is now usually described as a form of energy, which can be converted into mechanical work, and vice versa. Carnot's theory was eventually rescued by Rudolf Clausius and (independently) William Thomson (Lord Kelvin), who made the necessary corrections. Today most students are taught not Carnot's theory but the rescued version. If Carnot's version is taught first it is easier to understand. This detail will be explained later.

== Context and motivation ==
Carnot's motivation was practical. "The purpose of Reflexions was to bring to public notice the potential of the steam engine for improving the standard of living in France".

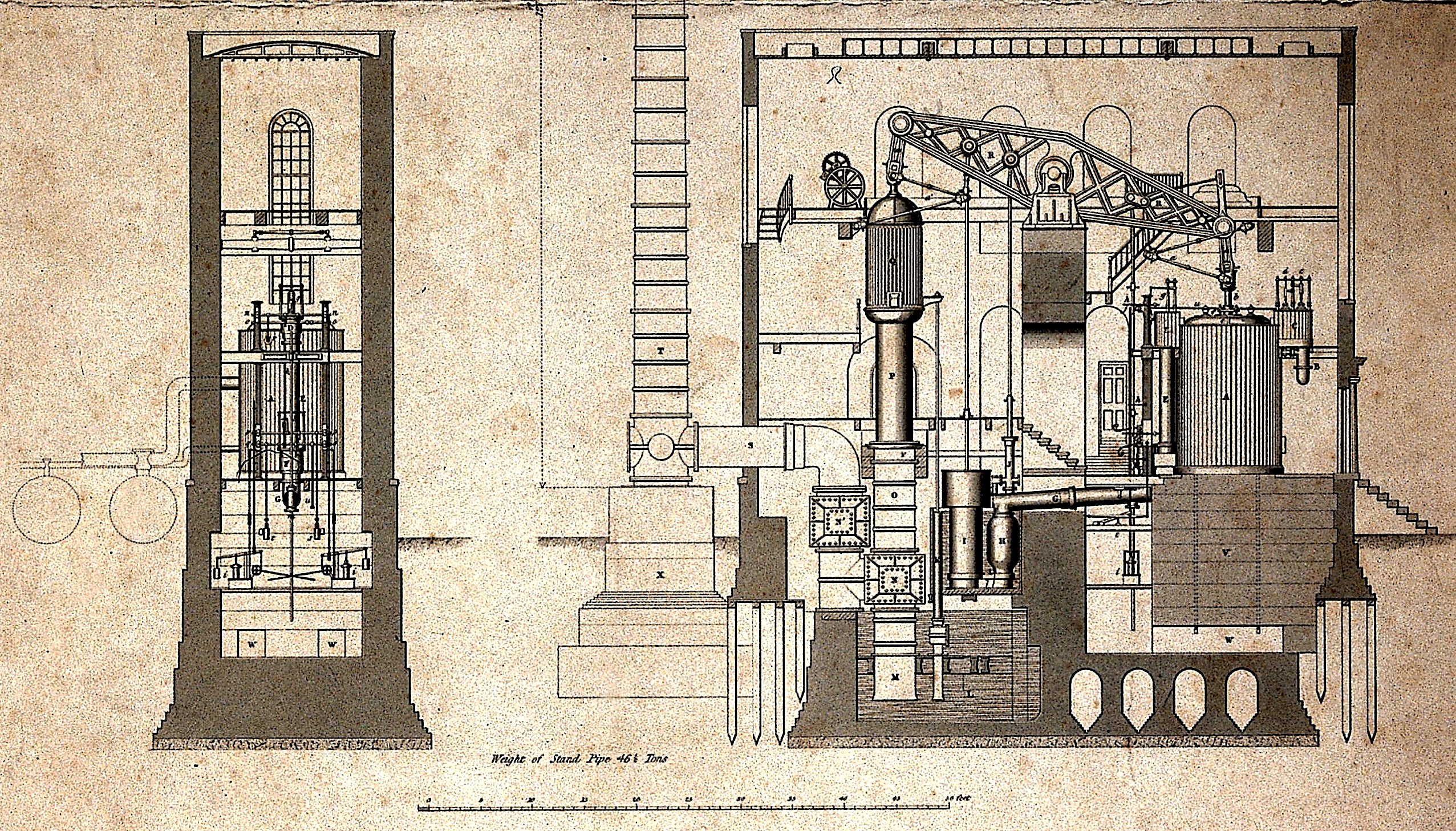
Cornish steam engines, famous for their efficiency, were avidly studied in France where fuel was expensive (Wellcome Collection).

The first useful steam engines were developed in Britain and were typically employed for pumping water out of coal mines. Since an engine could burn the mine's own coal (including waste coal, which had no commercial value) fuel economy was of little concern. The incentive to have efficient engines arose in parts of the country where fuel was costly, such as Cornwall.

The mines of Cornwall produced useful metals like tin; but not coal. The fuel to power their pumping engines had to be imported by sea and was expensive; users were keenly aware that "heat cost money". They sought the engine that did the best "duty'", measured in millions of pounds of water lifted one foot high per bushel of coal burnt. A practical business measure, it was a crude indication of the thermodynamic efficiency of an engine.

Cornish engineers were famous for the efficiency of their engines and their achievements were studied avidly, not least in France, where coal was expensive too. Sadi Carnot's book mentioned three of them by name, Richard Trevithick, Arthur Woolf and Jonathan Hornblower. Such men developed the Cornish engine in which high pressure steam was cut off early when the piston was at the beginning of its stroke, letting the steam's expansion complete the stroke by itself. Today it might be called adiabatic expansion.

Their ideas were enthusiastically taken up in France, where additionally, scientists and engineers were interested in the theory of steam and other engines.

== Carnot's aim ==
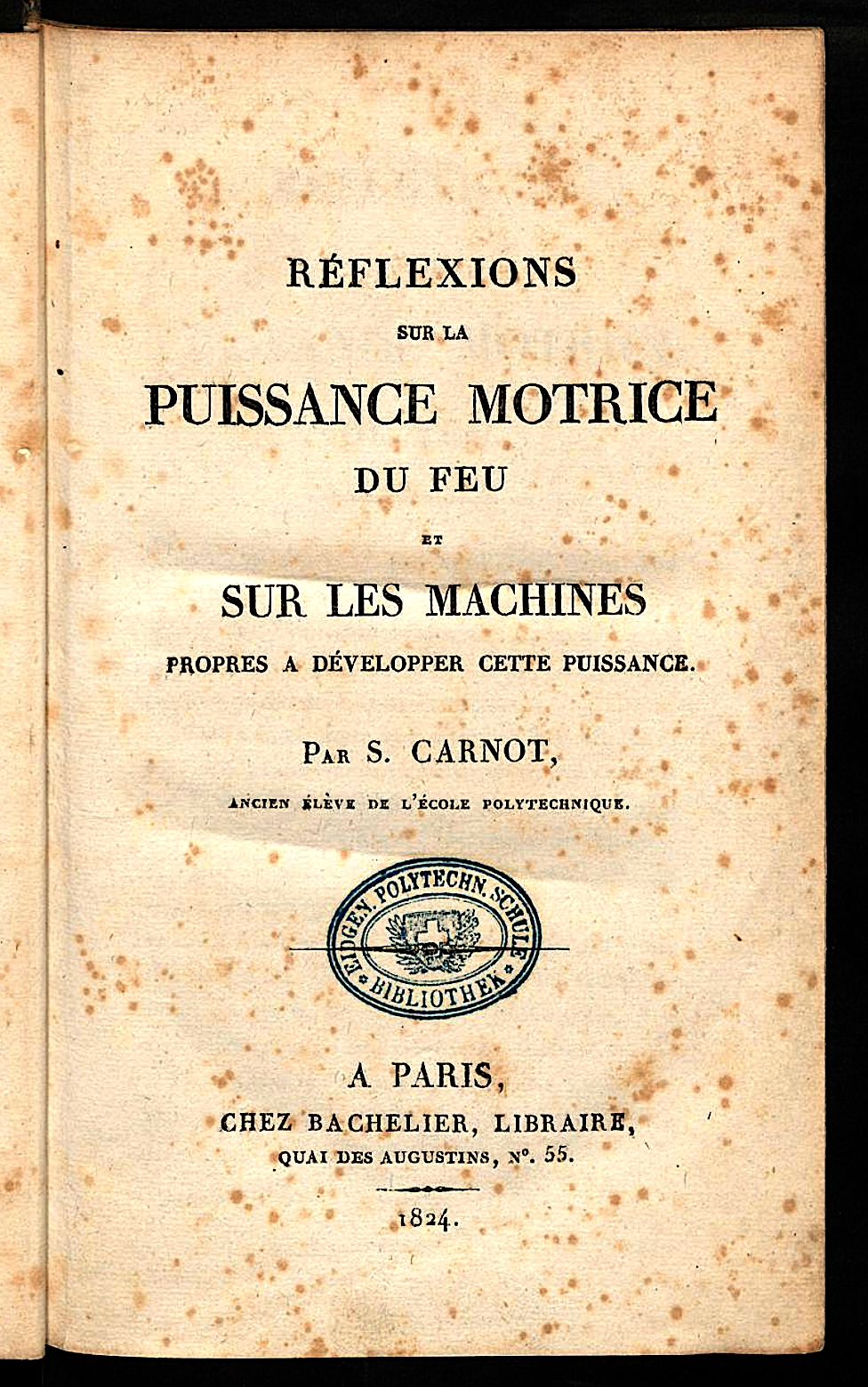
Title page of Sadi Carnot's celebrated work (Bibliothèque nationale de France)

"Every one knows that heat can produce motion", began Carnot. Typically it was done by steam engines. Important to the Industrial Revolution, they had been vastly improved by practical British engineers, said Carnot, but without really understanding the theory of what they were doing.

Because of the remarkable improvements that had already been made in fuel efficiency - a ten-fold increase since 1775 - it was asked whether it would go on for ever. Or would engineers run up against a fundamental limit, impossible to exceed? Matters such as these had attracted some of the ablest mathematicians and physicists in France.

Engineers also wondered if there could be a better working substance than steam. In principle, anything that exerted a force when heated and cooled might work, even a solid metallic bar. Many substances were tried or considered, for example the Stirling engine used air. Others included alcohol, ammonia, even mercury; there were hundreds of such exotic proposals, some dangerous: there were ships and factories powered by engines that worked by boiling ether, a highly flammable liquid.

To answer questions such as these, said Carnot, one needed to think generally, to go beyond the details of this or that engine.

It is necessary to establish principles applicable not only to steam-engines but to all imaginable heat-engines.

For historian of science John D. Norton "it is important to realize just how audacious it was of Sadi to seek such a simple general theory, let alone to find it", for the practical engines of his day were already very complicated devices.

== Reasoning ==
Edwin Thompson Jaynes wrote:

Carnot's reasoning is outstandingly beautiful, because it deduces so much from so little — and with such a sweeping generality that rises above all tedious details — but at the same time with such a compelling logical force. In this respect, I think that Carnot's principle ranks with Einstein's principle of relativity.

Historian of science D. S. L. Cardwell wrote: "Nothing unnecessary is included and nothing essential is missed out. It is, in fact, very difficult to think of a more efficient piece of abstraction in the history of science since Galileo taught men the basis of the procedure".

Carnot used the water-power analogy. Heat produces motion only by "falling" from hot to cool place.

=== 1. Heat, without a cold place, cannot generate motion ===
Carnot first showed that heat by itself cannot produce motion: it must also have a cooler place to go to. The common steam engine had a hot place (the furnace) and a cool place (the condenser); but he proved the same principle must be true for all heat engines that can possibly be devised.

He imagined an engine with no cold sink at all, where the engine and its surroundings are uniformly hot. Such an engine can deliver no power at all: the piston will not extend nor retract. (As Feynman put it, "If the whole world were at the same temperature, one could not convert any of its heat energy into work".) "It is necessary that there should also be cold; without it, the heat would be useless", said Carnot. (Power station cooling towers were developed to provide such cool places, as were automobile radiators; such recipients for waste heat are called cold sinks, or more directly, heat sinks.)

Carnot supplied an analogy of a waterfall. He wrote:

The motive power of a waterfall depends on its height and on the quantity of the liquid; the motive power of heat depends also on the quantity of caloric used, and on what may be termed [...] the height of its fall, that is to say, the difference of temperature of the bodies between which the exchange of caloric is made.

The insight was that heat engines can only produce motion by exploiting the difference in temperature between two places. This was afterwards used to formulate the Second Law of Thermodynamics:

The Second Law of Thermodynamics (the Kelvin-Planck formulation)

It is impossible to construct an engine that, operating in a cycle, will produce no effect other than the extraction of heat from a reservoir and the performance of an equivalent amount of work.

If the second law were not true, it would be possible to drive a steam-ship across the ocean by extracting heat from the ocean. — Mark Zemansky.

A ship's engine cannot extract heat from the ocean only for lack of a suitable cold sink. A small engine for polar regions has been proposed that exploits the temperature difference between the sea (just above freezing) and the much colder winter atmosphere (−25 °C).

=== 2. A heat engine can be run in reverse and will behave as a refrigerator ===
==== Running an engine backwards ====
Carnot reasoned that, like a water-mill, the heat engine could be run backwards. Instead of exploiting the "fall" to get useful mechanical effort, we could do the reverse: expend the mechanical effort to drive the caloric "upwards".

Specifically, by forcing the engine backwards, we can make heat go from the cool place to the hot place, contrary to what naturally happens. The cool place will be made even cooler (as in a refrigerator) and the hot place will be made even hotter, (Note: Unless they are infinitely large reservoirs.) i.e. a heat pump.

The idea that it is possible to convey heat from a cool to a warm place, but only by the expenditure of mechanical effort, lies at the heart of another way of stating the Second Law of Thermodynamics.

==== Reversibility as an index of efficiency ====
Carnot went on to develop the crucial idea that, the more efficient the engine, the greater the proportion of heat that can be recovered if run backwards.

Historian of science D. S. L. Cardwell believed that Carnot was inspired by the column-of-water engine, an early form of hydropower. Popular in districts where coal was scarce, it was similar to a steam engine, but driven by the pressure of a head of water instead of steam. Like the steam engine, engineers strove to make it more efficient; and they expressed its efficiency in terms of the proportion of water that could be restored if run backwards, when it behaved as a pump.

=== 3. The ideally efficient heat engine would be completely reversible ===
Carnot went on to prove that if a heat engine could be made completely reversible, its efficiency would be unsurpassable. It is, therefore, the fundamental limit beyond which engine efficiency cannot possibly go, answering his earlier question. Today this engine is called the Carnot engine in his honour. When it is run in reverse, it consumes as much motive power as it generates when it is run forward.

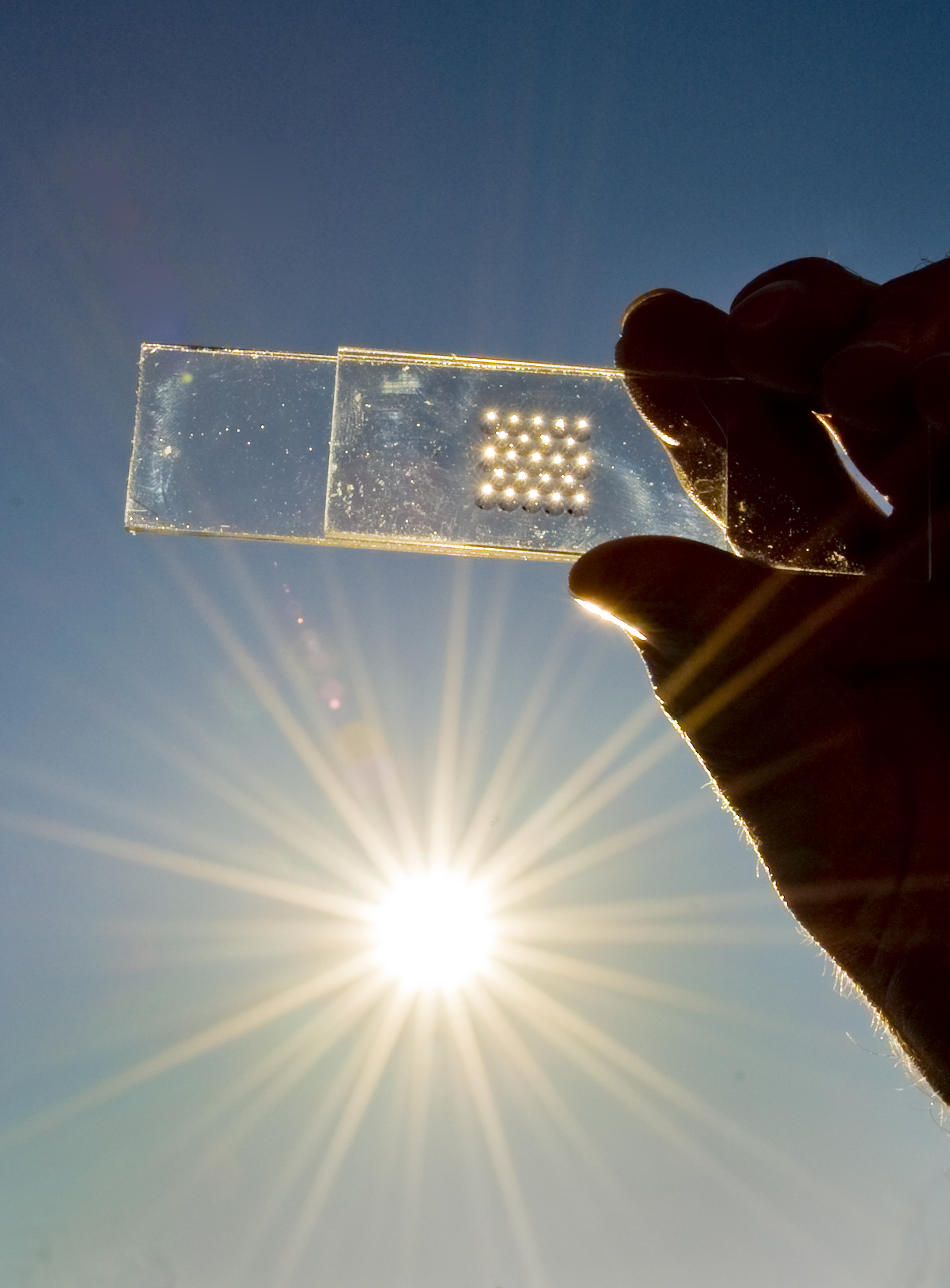
Solar cells are heat engines

The Carnot engine is not one anyone would attempt to build. Its point is that it represents the ideal or extreme limit which cannot be surpassed even in theory. It is a benchmark against which all real engines can be compared. For example, solar cells are heat engines, and "Carnot efficiency appears profusely in the numerous formulae that have been suggested for solar energy conversion".

For Carnot, a completely (Note: "Completely reversible" here is just a convenient explanatory phrase, not a technical expression. In thermodynamics the simpler term "reversible" is used to denote a process that, if run backwards, will exactly recover the starting conditions.) reversible engine has this property. Run forwards as a motor, one cycle can lift a weight a certain distance [generate a certain amount of work] while transferring a certain amount of heat from the hot place to the cool place. Run backwards as a refrigerator, one cycle will exactly restore the original conditions. All real engines fall short of this ideal standard, since along the way they lose a fraction of the heat.

The proof is as follows. Suppose there was such a thing as a 'super' engine: one even more efficient than a Carnot engine. Then we could use it to drive a Carnot engine backwards. The Carnot engine would restore the heat from cold to hot place. In effect, the imaginary super engine would be delivering a margin of useful power while using the Carnot engine to feed itself an inexhaustible supply of fuel. Wrote one commentator: "Once started, this would run forever, delivering an infinite amount of useful work without any further expenditure of fuel". We would have perpetual motion to "drive our ships, locomotives and factories".

Since this is absurd and inadmissible, we must conclude that the supposed super engine cannot exist. Hence

Carnot's Principle

No heat engine can be more efficient than a completely reversible one operating between the same temperatures.

Physicist Sir Joseph Larmor wrote that this argument "is perhaps the most original in physical science".

=== 4. It does not depend on finding a superlative working substance ===
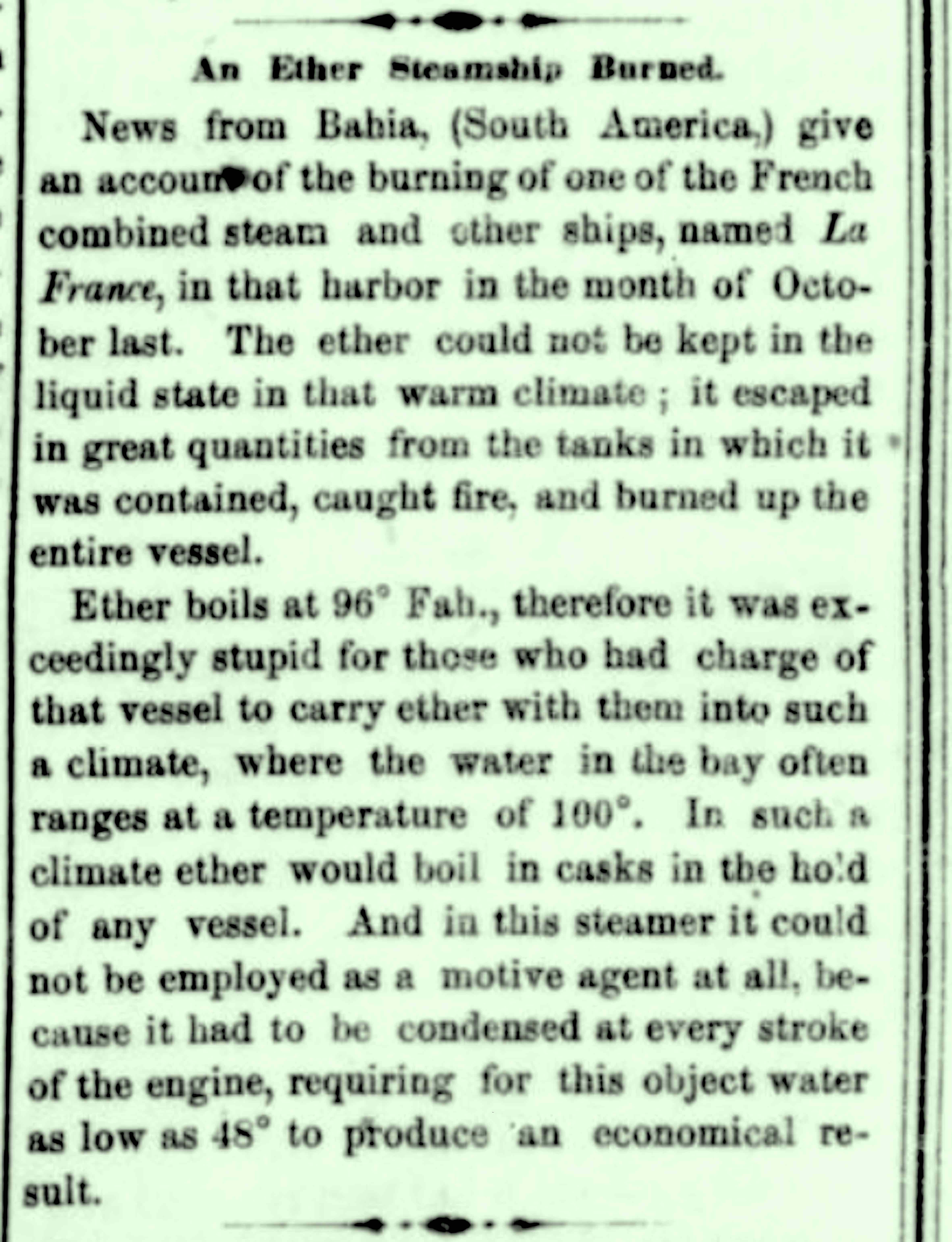
Scientific American, 1856. Ether engines continued to be made.

It follows at once that all engines, if reversible, must have the same efficiency if operating between those temperatures, regardless of their working substances. It cannot depend on the working substance, for in the above proof none was specified: it might have been steam, air, or anything else.

(That all reversible engines working between the same heat source and cool place have the same efficiency is yet another way of stating the Second Law of Thermodynamics, and many authors have credited the law to Sadi Carnot himself.)

Therefore, advised Carnot, there was little to be gained by experimenting with exotic substances, for none was intrinsically more efficient. As a practical matter the only promising substitute for steam was air, because "Air could be heated directly by combustion carried on within its own mass" — in other words, the internal combustion engine.

Rather, the guiding principle in practical engine design should be that the temperature of the working fluid should fall from as high as possible to as low as possible, acting expansively.

=== 5. The Carnot cycle ===
To make his proof more rigorous he went on to describe an engine actually working between a hot reservoir and cold sink in a completely reversible cycle. For this to happen each step in the cycle had itself to be reversible i.e. it must not waste any fraction of the heat.

The fundamental rule for not wasting heat

"Now, very little reflection would show that all change of temperature which is not due to a change of volume of the bodies can be only a useless [escape of heat]. The necessary condition of the maximum is, then, that in the bodies employed to realize the motive power of heat there should not occur any change of temperature which may not be due to a change of volume. Reciprocally, every time that this condition is fulfilled the maximum will be attained. This principle should never be lost sight of in the construction of heat-engines; it is its fundamental basis".

"Every change of temperature which is not due to a change of volume ... is necessarily due to the direct passage of the caloric from a more or less heated body to a colder body. This passage occurs mainly by the contact of bodies of different temperatures; hence such contact should be avoided as much as possible".

Carnot, Reflections, 56-7.

The four phases of the endless Carnot cycle

The fundamental rule for not wasting heat, deduced Carnot (see quote box), is never to allow direct thermal contact between parts which are at appreciably different temperatures. Were that to permitted, heat would escape from hotter to cooler: without doing any work.

Very few thermodynamic processes can be carried out without breaking that rule. For instance, if we wanted to expand a body of gas in a cylinder to drive a piston, we would normally just heat it up: but this would require thermal contact with something hotter.

However, there are two extreme cases in which it is just possible in principle:

1. Completely insulate the body of gas and allow it to expand spontaneously from its own internal energy; this will lower its temperature. This is called adiabatic expansion. (The idea was used in the Cornish engine, above.)
2. Apply heat to the body of gas so slowly that it has time to expand without raising its temperature. (Note: I.e. the temperature difference between heat source and the body of gas is infinitesimal.) For this to happen, the temperature gap between gas and heat source must be infinitesimal. This is called isothermal expansion.

Carnot’s cycle combines them into a working, reversible cycle: To retract the piston and exactly restore the initial conditions, the same processes are to be used in reverse viz. isothermal compression and adiabatic compression.

Hence his cycle can be analyzed into four steps. In the isothermal phases, more energy is produced in the (hot) expansion stroke than is consumed in the (cool) compression stoke. The adiabatic phases exactly cancel out. So the net balance is positive.

The Carnot Cycle is illustrated in the animation; and since it is completely reversible, by Carnot's Principle its efficiency must be the best that can be achieved.

It is usual nowadays when drawing the Carnot cycle to include a pressure–volume diagram with associated mathematics. This was not done by Carnot himself and is not necessary for an intuitive understanding of his ideas.

James Clerk Maxwell wrote:

The great merit of Carnot's method is that he arranges his operations in a cycle, so as to leave the working substance in precisely the same condition as he found it. We are therefore sure that the energy remaining in the working substance is the same in amount as at the beginning of the cycle.

This greatly simplifies any calculations, since we only have to compare the heat taken in, the heat given out, and the work done by the engine

== Carnot's diagram ==
In the adjacent diagram, from Carnot's 1824 work, Reflections on the Motive Power of Fire, there are "two bodies A and B, kept each at a constant temperature, that of A being higher than that of B. These two bodies to which we can give, or from which we can remove the heat without causing their temperatures to vary, exercise the functions of two unlimited reservoirs of caloric. We will call the first the furnace and the second the refrigerator." Carnot then explains how we can obtain motive power, i.e., "work", by carrying a certain quantity of heat from body A to body B. It also acts as a cooler and hence can also act as a refrigerator.

== Modern diagram ==
Carnot engine diagram (modern) - where an amount of heat Q_{H} flows from a high temperature T_{H} furnace through the fluid of the "working body" (working substance) and the remaining heat Q_{C} flows into the cold sink T_{C}, thus forcing the working substance to do mechanical work W on the surroundings, via cycles of contractions and expansions.

The previous image shows the original piston-and-cylinder diagram used by Carnot in discussing his ideal engine. The figure at right shows a block diagram of a generic heat engine, such as the Carnot engine. In the diagram, the "working body" (system), a term introduced by Clausius in 1850, can be any fluid or vapor body through which heat Q can be introduced or transmitted to produce work. Carnot had postulated that the fluid body could be any substance capable of expansion, such as vapor of water, vapor of alcohol, vapor of mercury, a permanent gas, air, etc. Although in those early years, engines came in a number of configurations, typically Q_{H} was supplied by a boiler, wherein water was boiled over a furnace; Q_{C} was typically removed by a stream of cold flowing water in the form of a condenser located on a separate part of the engine. The output work, W, is transmitted by the movement of the piston as it is used to turn a crank-arm, which in turn was typically used to power a pulley so as to lift water out of flooded salt mines. Carnot defined work as "weight lifted through a height".

== Carnot cycle ==
Figure 1: A Carnot cycle illustrated on a PV diagram to illustrate the work done.

Figure 2: A Carnot cycle acting as a heat engine, illustrated on a temperature-entropy diagram. The cycle takes place between a hot reservoir at temperature T_{H} and a cold reservoir at temperature T_{C}. The vertical axis is temperature, the horizontal axis is entropy.

The Carnot cycle when acting as a heat engine consists of the following steps:

1. Reversible isothermal expansion of the gas at the "hot" temperature, T_{H} (isothermal heat addition or absorption). During this step (A to B) the gas is allowed to expand and it does work on the surroundings. The temperature of the gas (the system) does not change during the process, and thus the expansion is isothermic. The gas expansion is propelled by absorption of heat energy Q_{H} and of entropy ΔS_{H} = Q_{H} / T_{H} from the high temperature reservoir.
2. Isentropic (reversible adiabatic) expansion of the gas (isentropic work output). For this step (B to C) the piston and cylinder are assumed to be thermally insulated, thus they neither gain nor lose heat. The gas continues to expand, doing work on the surroundings, and losing an equivalent amount of internal energy. The gas expansion causes it to cool to the "cold" temperature, T_{C}. The entropy remains unchanged.
3. Reversible isothermal compression of the gas at the "cold" temperature, T_{C} (isothermal heat rejection) (C to D). Now the gas is exposed to the cold temperature reservoir while the surroundings do work on the gas by compressing it (such as through the return compression of a piston), while causing an amount of waste heat Q_{C} < 0 (with the standard sign convention for heat) and of entropy ΔS_{C} = Q_{C}/T_{C} < 0 to flow out of the gas to the low temperature reservoir. (In magnitude, this is the same amount of entropy absorbed in step 1. The entropy decreases in isothermal compression since the multiplicity of the system decreases with the volume.) In terms of magnitude, the recompression work performed by the surroundings in this step is less than the work performed on the surroundings in step 1 because it occurs at a lower pressure due to the lower temperature (i.e. the resistance to compression is lower under step 3 than the force of expansion under step 1). We can refer to the first law of thermodynamics to explain this behavior: ΔU= W+Q .
4. Isentropic compression of the gas (isentropic work input) (D to A). Once again the piston and cylinder are assumed to be thermally insulated and the cold temperature reservoir is removed. During this step, the surroundings continue to do work to further compress the gas and both the temperature and pressure rise now that the heat sink has been removed. This additional work increases the internal energy of the gas, compressing it and causing the temperature to rise to T_{H}. The entropy remains unchanged. At this point the gas is in the same state as at the start of step 1.

== Carnot's theorem ==
Real ideal engines (left) compared to the Carnot cycle (right). The entropy of a real material changes with temperature. This change is indicated by the curve on a T–S diagram. For this figure, the curve indicates a vapor-liquid equilibrium (See Rankine cycle). Irreversible systems and losses of heat (for example, due to friction) prevent the ideal from taking place at every step.

Carnot's theorem is a formal statement of this fact: No engine operating between two heat reservoirs can be more efficient than a Carnot engine operating between the same reservoirs.

$$\eta_{I}=\frac{W}{Q_{\mathrm{H}}}=1-\frac{T_{\mathrm{C}}}{T_{\mathrm{H}}}$$

=== Explanation ===
This maximum efficiency η_{I} is defined as above:

- W is the work done by the system (energy exiting the system as work),
- Q_{H} is the heat put into the system (heat energy entering the system),
- T_{C} is the absolute temperature of the cold reservoir, and
- T_{H} is the absolute temperature of the hot reservoir.

A corollary to Carnot's theorem states that: All reversible engines operating between the same heat reservoirs are equally efficient.

It is easily shown that the efficiency η is maximum when the entire cyclic process is a reversible process. This means the total entropy of system and surroundings (the entropies of the hot furnace, the "working fluid" of the heat engine, and the cold sink) remains constant when the "working fluid" completes one cycle and returns to its original state. (In the general and more realistic case of an irreversible process, the total entropy of this combined system would increase.)

Since the "working fluid" comes back to the same state after one cycle, and entropy of the system is a state function, the change in entropy of the "working fluid" system is 0. Thus, it implies that the total entropy change of the furnace and sink is zero, for the process to be reversible and the efficiency of the engine to be maximum. This derivation is carried out in the next section.

The coefficient of performance (COP) of the heat engine is the reciprocal of its efficiency.

== Efficiency ==
It is sometimes stated that Carnot gave the formula for the efficiency of his engine. He could not have done, since his theory did not embrace the First Law of Thermodynamics, not then known. Carnot himself was able to state that it depended on the temperature difference between the hot source and cold sink, and the temperature of the cold sink.. But he did not give the explicit formula.

The efficiency even of the ideal or Carnot engine turns out to be surprisingly poor, and therefore, that of real engines is even worse. It has been said that the Second Law of Thermodynamics imposes an "energy tax", payable to Nature, every time heat is converted to work.

=== Carnot engine ===
The Carnot engine's efficiency depends on only two temperatures and its calculation is simple. It can be considered in terms of the fraction of heat that goes down the cold sink instead of being converted to work — the "energy tax" that must be paid to nature.

This fraction is simply the temperature of the cold sink divided by the temperature of the hot sink; they must be measured in degrees kelvin. (On this scale 0 K is absolute zero. Fahrenheit or Celsius temperatures would give erroneous results since these scales were arbitrarily defined.)

For example if the hot temperature is 373 K (water boils) and the cold temperature is 273 K (ice melts), then 73% of the heat must go down the cold sink, an escapable fact of nature. The engine's efficiency working between those temperatures is thus only 27%.

=== Timescale ===
In fact, the Carnot engine cannot deliver even that performance within a realistic timescale.

Of the four phases of the Carnot cycle, the two isothermals must be performed extremely slowly. (If not, there would be an appreciable temperature gradient, implying heat loss and irreversibility, see above.) But this means that the engine takes infinite time to perform a cycle, or put crudely, it never does.

If the engine is to operate in real time, it becomes necessary to sacrifice some of its reversibility. It then develops real power, but it is no longer a true Carnot engine, and its efficiency is less.

It has been calculated that the fraction of waste heat down the cold sink then is, not the ratio of the two temperatures (as above), but the square root of that number.

This result was derived by Curzon and Ahlborn — though they were not the first to do so — who claimed that it more closely predicts the performance of real thermal generators.

For example, if working between given temperatures a Carnot engine loses 1/4 of its heat down the cool sink, it will lose 1/2 in real time operation.

=== Practicality ===
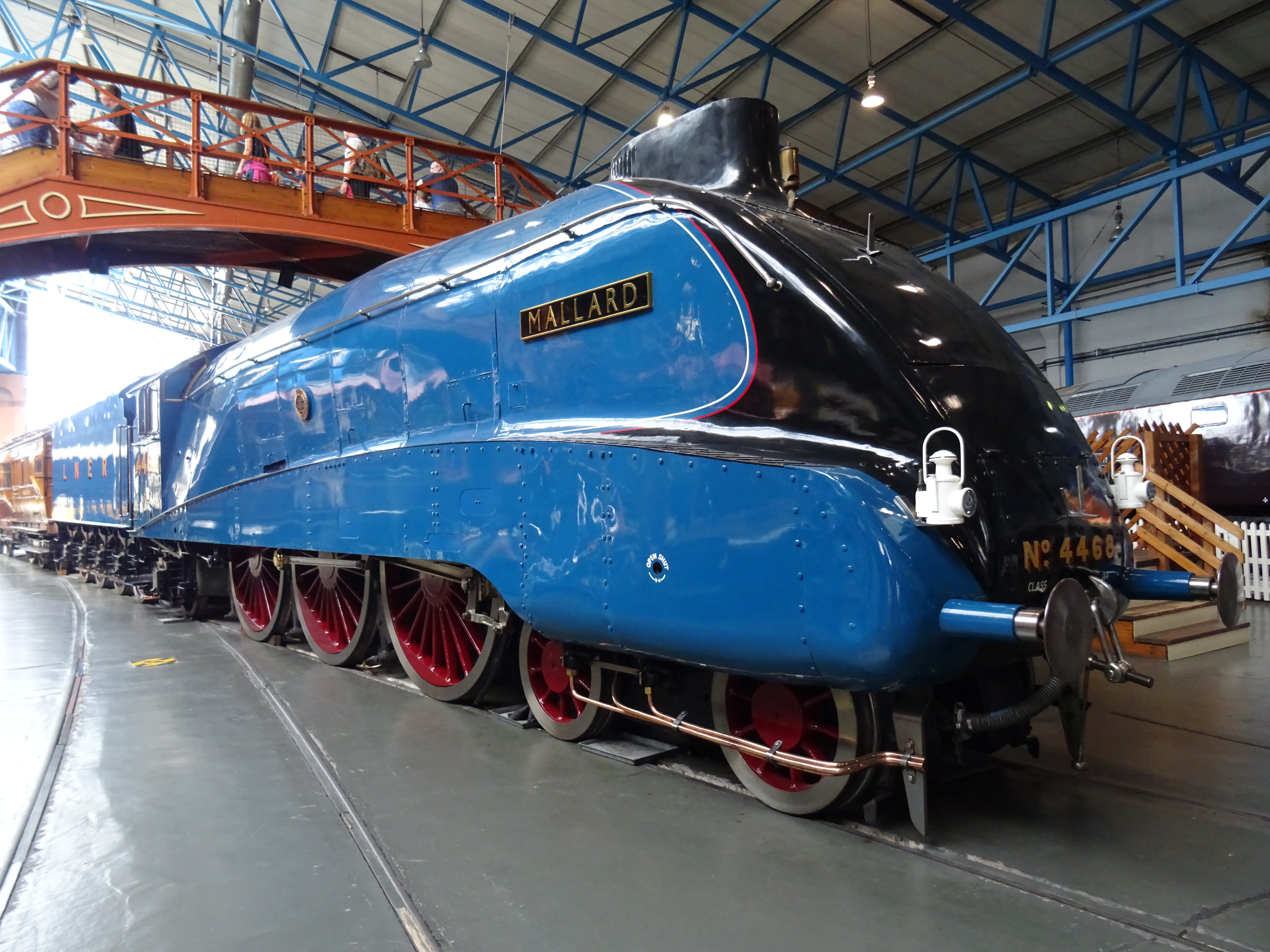
Steam locomotives turned only 4% of their heat into work. The rest went to warming up the countryside.

The Carnot engine is supposed to be frictionless and have perfect insulation or conduction where required. Real engines can never match these criteria and their efficiency is poorer. Further, the hot temperature cannot be made extremely high, for practical materials reasons, and the cold temperature can rarely be made very low.

==== Material limitations ====
For example, in the first commercial nuclear power stations the fuel rods could not operate above 450 °C for fear of melting the Magnox cladding. The thermal efficiency was 23%. Later alloys allowed the temperature to be raised to 640 °C, which could deliver a thermal efficiency of 41%.

==== Steam locomotives ====
A good cold sink is needed for efficiency. In the traditional steam railway locomotive such was lacking, since it had no condenser, and simply vented waste steam into the atmosphere. It turned only 4% of its heat into mechanical work. The rest went "straight to heat up the countryside".

==== Cars and trucks ====
Car engines can have efficiencies of 20% or less, compared to their Carnot Limit of 37%. The highest efficiency for a commercial vehicle diesel engine (2021) was claimed to be 50%.

==== Power stations ====
According to Mitsubishi Heavy Industries, in 2022 the world's highest thermal efficiency was achieved at the Joetsu Thermal Power Station No 1, Japan, being certified by Guinness World Records. It was 63.62%.

==== Solar cells ====
Solar cells are heat engines, and they start off with the advantage that the hot reservoir — the Sun — is at 6,000 K. Assuming a good cold sink this would give a Carnot efficiency of 95%. However a solar cell is not a Carnot engine. A 2016 review found that after allowing for various losses they achieved 7-8% efficiency, though it was hoped to raise this.

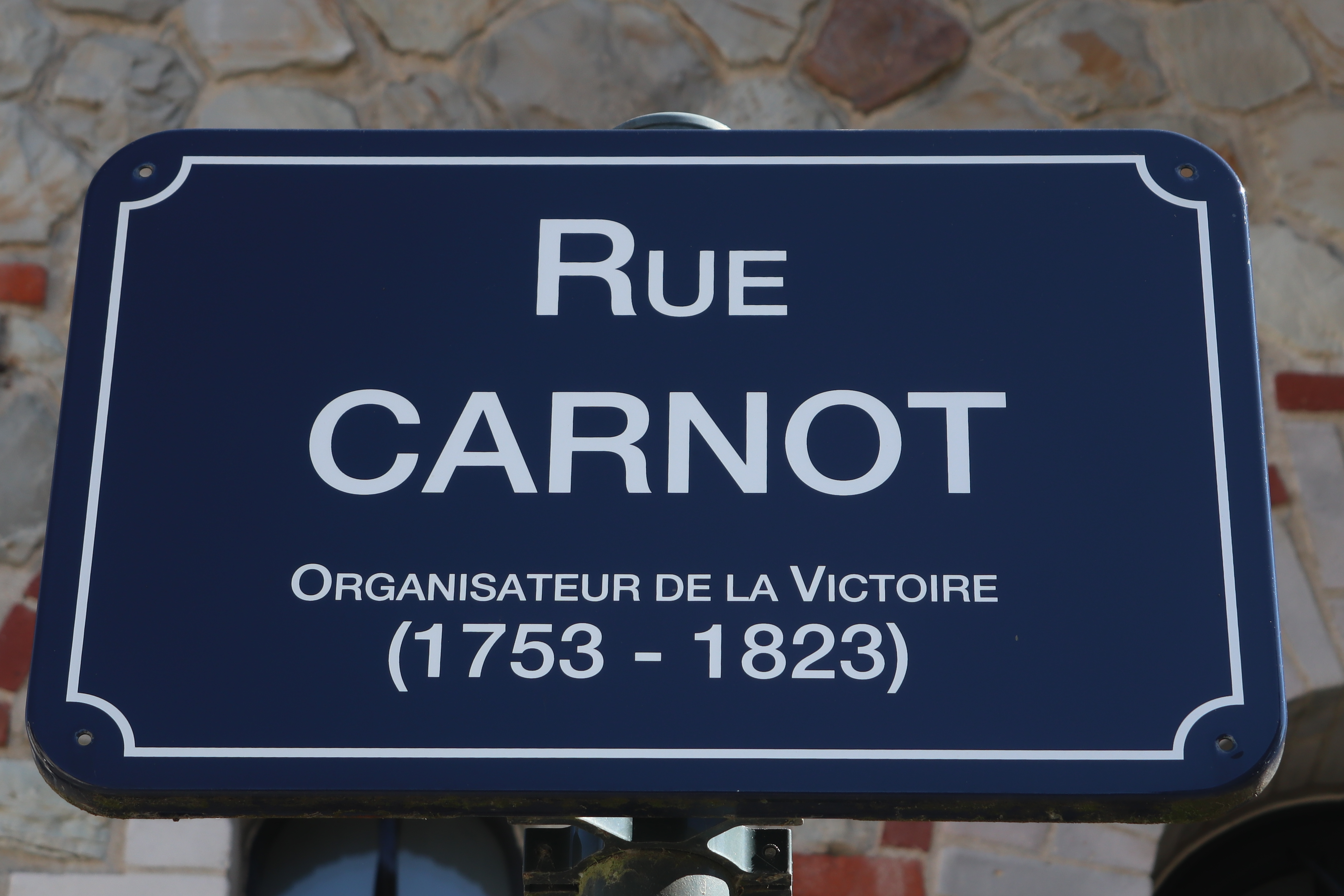
There are many Rue Carnots in France, but they are named after Sadi's relatives.

== Efficiency of real heat engines ==
For a real heat engine, the total thermodynamic process is generally irreversible. The working fluid is brought back to its initial state after one cycle, and thus the change of entropy of the fluid system is 0, but the sum of the entropy changes in the hot and cold reservoir in this one cyclical process is greater than 0.

The internal energy of the fluid is also a state variable, so its total change in one cycle is 0. So the total work done by the system W is equal to the net heat put into the system, the sum of Q_{H} > 0 taken up and the waste heat Q_{C} < 0 given off:

$W=Q=Q_\text{H}+Q_\text{C}$	2

For real engines, stages 1 and 3 of the Carnot cycle, in which heat is absorbed by the "working fluid" from the hot reservoir, and released by it to the cold reservoir, respectively, no longer remain ideally reversible, and there is a temperature differential between the temperature of the reservoir and the temperature of the fluid while heat exchange takes place.

During heat transfer from the hot reservoir at T_{H} to the fluid, the fluid would have a slightly lower temperature than T_{H}, and the process for the fluid may not necessarily remain isothermal. Let ΔS_{H} be the total entropy change of the fluid in the process of intake of heat.

$\Delta S_\text{H}=\int_{Q_\text{in}} \frac{\text{d}Q_\text{H}}{T}$	3

where the temperature of the fluid T is always slightly lesser than T_{H}, in this process.

So, one would get:

$\frac{Q_\text{H}}{T_\text{H}}=\frac{\int \text{d}Q_\text{H}}{T_\text{H}} \leqslant \Delta S_\text{H}$	4

Similarly, at the time of heat injection from the fluid to the cold reservoir one would have, for the magnitude of total entropy change ΔS_{C} < 0 of the fluid in the process of expelling heat:

$\Delta S_\text{C}\geqslant\frac{Q_\text{C}}{T_\text{C}}< 0$	5

where, during this process of transfer of heat to the cold reservoir, the temperature of the fluid T is always slightly greater than T_{C}.

We have only considered the magnitude of the entropy change here. Since the total change of entropy of the fluid system for the cyclic process is 0, we must have

$\Delta S_\text{H}+\Delta S_\text{C} = \Delta S_\text{cycle} = 0$	6

The previous three equations, namely (3), (4), (5), substituted into (6) to give:

$-\frac{Q_\text{C}}{T_\text{C}}\geqslant\frac{Q_\text{H}}{T_\text{H}}$	7

for adding inequalities (3) and (4) gives ΔS_{H} + ΔS_{C} ≥ Q_{H}/T_{H} + Q_{C}/T_{C} and substituting ΔS_{H} + ΔS_{C} = 0 from (6) gives Q_{H}/T_{H} + Q_{C}/T_{C} ≤ 0.

Equations (2) and (7) combine to give

$\frac{W}{Q_\text{H}} \leq 1- \frac{T_\text{C}}{T_\text{H}}$	8

To derive this step needs two adiabatic processes involved to show an isentropic process property for the ratio of the changing volumes of two isothermal processes are equal.

Most importantly, since the two adiabatic processes are volume works without heat lost, and since the ratio of volume changes for this two processes are the same, so the works for these two adiabatic processes are the same with opposite direction to each other, namely, one direction is work done by the system and the other is work done on the system; therefore, heat efficiency only concerns the amount of work done by the heat absorbed comparing to the amount of heat absorbed by the system.

Therefore,

$\frac{W}{Q_H} = \frac{Q_H - Q_C}{Q_H}$

= $1-\frac{Q_C}{Q_H}$

= $1-\frac{T_C}{T_H}$

And, from (7)

$\frac{Q_H}{T_H} \leq -\frac{Q_C}{T_C}$ Here $Q_C<0$(heat released)

$\implies \frac{T_C}{T_H} \leq - \frac {Q_C}{Q_H}$

$\implies -\frac{T_C}{T_H} \geq \frac{Q_C}{Q_H}$

$\implies 1-\frac{T_C}{T_H} \geq 1 +\frac {Q_C}{Q_H}$

$\implies 1-\frac{T_C}{T_H} \geq \frac{Q_H + Q_C}{Q_H}$ Here $Q_C<0$

$\implies 1-\frac {T_C}{T_H} \geq \frac {Q_H-Q_C}{Q_H}$

$\therefore 1-\frac{T_C}{T_H} \geq \frac {W}{Q_H}$

Hence,

$\eta \leq \eta_\text{I}$	9

where $\eta = \frac{W}{Q_\text{H}}$ is the efficiency of the real engine, and $\eta_\text{I}$ is the efficiency of the Carnot engine working between the same two reservoirs at the temperatures $T_\text{H}$ and $T_\text{C}$. For the Carnot engine, the entire process is 'reversible', and Equation (7) is an equality. Hence, the efficiency of the real engine is always less than the ideal Carnot engine.

Equation (7) signifies that the total entropy of system and surroundings (the fluid and the two reservoirs) increases for the real engine, because (in a surroundings-based analysis) the entropy gain of the cold reservoir as $Q_\text{C}$ flows into it at the fixed temperature $T_\text{C}$, is greater than the entropy loss of the hot reservoir as $Q_\text{H}$ leaves it at its fixed temperature $T_\text{H}$. The inequality in Equation (7) is essentially the statement of the Clausius theorem.

According to the second theorem, "The efficiency of the Carnot engine is independent of the nature of the working substance".

== The Carnot engine and Rudolf Diesel ==
In 1892 Rudolf Diesel patented an internal combustion engine inspired by the Carnot engine. Diesel knew a Carnot engine is an ideal that cannot be built, but he thought he had invented a working approximation. His principle was unsound, but in his struggle to implement it he developed a practical Diesel engine.

The conceptual problem was how to achieve isothermal expansion in an internal combustion engine, since burning fuel at the highest temperature of the cycle would only raise the temperature further. Diesel's patented solution was: having achieved the highest temperature just by compressing the air, to add a small amount of fuel at a controlled rate, such that heating caused by burning the fuel would be counteracted by cooling caused by air expansion as the piston moved. Hence all the heat from the fuel would be transformed into work during the isothermal expansion, as required by Carnot's theorem.

For the idea to work a small mass of fuel would have to be burnt in a huge mass of air. Diesel first proposed a working engine that would compress air to 250 atmospheres at 800 °C (1,450 °F), then cycle to one atmosphere at 20 °C (50 °F). However, this was well beyond the technological capabilities of the day, since it implied a compression ratio of 60:1. Such an engine, if it could have been built, would have had an efficiency of 73%. (In contrast, the best steam engines of his day achieved 7%.)

Accordingly, Diesel sought to compromise. He calculated that, were he to reduce the peak pressure to a less ambitious 90 atmospheres, he would sacrifice only 5% of the thermal efficiency. Seeking financial support, he published the "Theory and Construction of a Rational Heat Engine to Take the Place of the Steam Engine and All Presently Known Combustion Engines" (1893). Endorsed by scientific opinion, including Lord Kelvin, he won the backing of Krupp and Maschinenfabrik Augsburg. He clung to the Carnot cycle as a symbol. But years of practical work failed to achieve an isothermal combustion engine, nor could have done, since it requires such an enormous quantity of air that it cannot develop enough power to compress it. Furthermore, controlled fuel injection turned out to be no easy matter.

Even so, the Diesel engine slowly evolved over 25 years to become a practical high-compression air engine, its fuel injected near the end of the compression stroke and ignited by the heat of compression, capable by 1969 of 40% efficiency.

== As a macroscopic construct ==
The Carnot heat engine is, ultimately, a theoretical construct based on an idealized thermodynamic system. On a practical human-scale level the Carnot cycle has proven a valuable model, as in advancing the development of the diesel engine. However, on a macroscopic scale limitations imposed by the model's assumptions prove it impractical, and, ultimately, incapable of doing any work. As such, per Carnot's theorem, the Carnot engine may be thought as the theoretical limit of macroscopic scale heat engines rather than any practical device that could ever be built.

For example, for the isothermal expansion part of the Carnot cycle, the following infinitesimal conditions must be satisfied simultaneously at every step in the expansion:

- The hot reservoir temperature T_{H} is infinitesimally higher than the system gas temperature T so heat flow (energy transfer) from the hot reservoir to the gas is made without increasing T (via infinitesimal work on the surroundings by the gas as another energy transfer); if T_{H} is significantly higher than T, then T may be not uniform through the gas so the system would deviate from thermal equilibrium as well as not being a reversible process (i.e. not a Carnot cycle) or T might increase noticeably so it would not be an isothermal process.
- The force externally applied on the piston (opposite to the internal force on the piston by the gas) needs to be infinitesimally reduced externally. Without this assistance, it would not be possible to follow a gas PV (Pressure-Volume) curve downward at a constant T since following this curve means that the gas-to-piston force decreases (P decreases) as the volume expands (the piston moves outward). If this assistance is so strong that the volume expansion is significant, the system may deviate from thermal equilibrium, and the process fail to be reversible (and thus not a Carnot cycle).

Such "infinitesimal" requirements as these (and others) cause the Carnot cycle to take an infinite amount of time, rendering the production of work impossible.

Other practical requirements that make the Carnot cycle impractical to realize include fine control of the gas, and perfect thermal contact with the surroundings (including high and low temperature reservoirs).

== Reliance on the Caloric theory ==
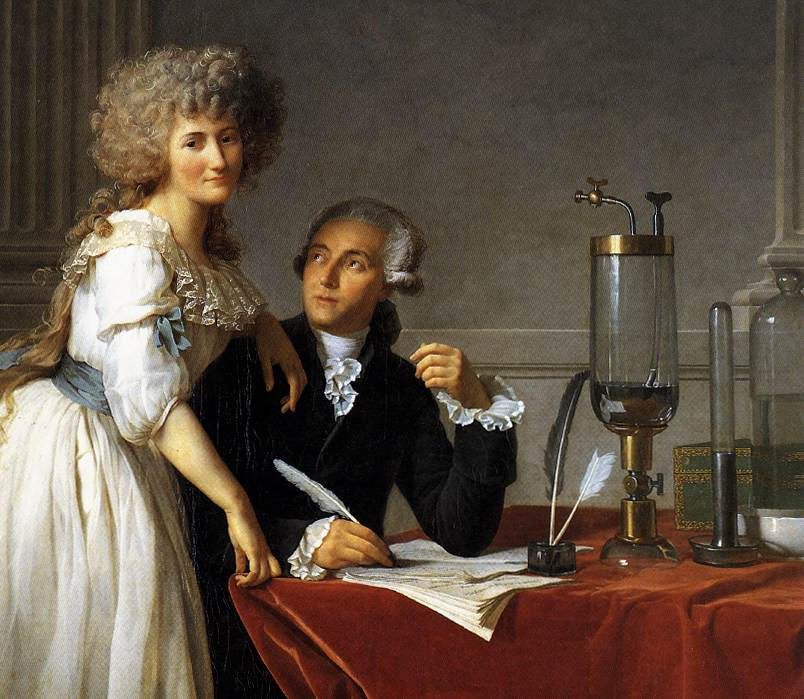
The highly successful caloric theory of heat had been developed by scientists like the Lavoisiers. For Lavoisier, caloric was a chemical element, like oxygen.

For most scientists of Carnot's time the best explanation of heat was the caloric theory. It held that heat is a material fluid that can flow from one place to another: its temperature may vary, but it can never itself be destroyed nor created.

The caloric theory was highly developed, mathematically sophisticated, and plausible. The alternative theory, that heat consists in the agitation of a substance's particles — in modern terms, energy — was well known, but did not command much support, mainly for lack of convincing experimental evidence. For historian of science Thomas Kuhn, "To analyze the gas engine Carnot required a developed theory of heat, and in the 1820's the caloric theory was the only one at hand".

Several authors have speculated that without the caloric theory and his waterfall analogy Carnot would not have been led to his discovery.

Pursuant to this core idea, Carnot taught that all heat entering his engine from the hot source must fall out into the cold sink. But according to new ideas — that were dawning on Carnot himself, and came to be adopted overwhelmingly — this is false. Some of the heat will be consumed on the way: by the doing of work.

=== Electricity ===
From 1800 new discoveries started to emerge — e.g. the galvanic battery, heat by electricity, electrolysis, electromagnetism, induced currents, thermoelectric cooling — which increasingly suggested that a single "force", nowadays called energy, was manifesting itself in different ways. According to Thomas Kuhn, the interconnection between previously detached branches of science was going on apace "and that is what Mary Somerville had in mind when, in 1834, she gave her famous popularization of science the title On the Connexion of the Physical Sciences".

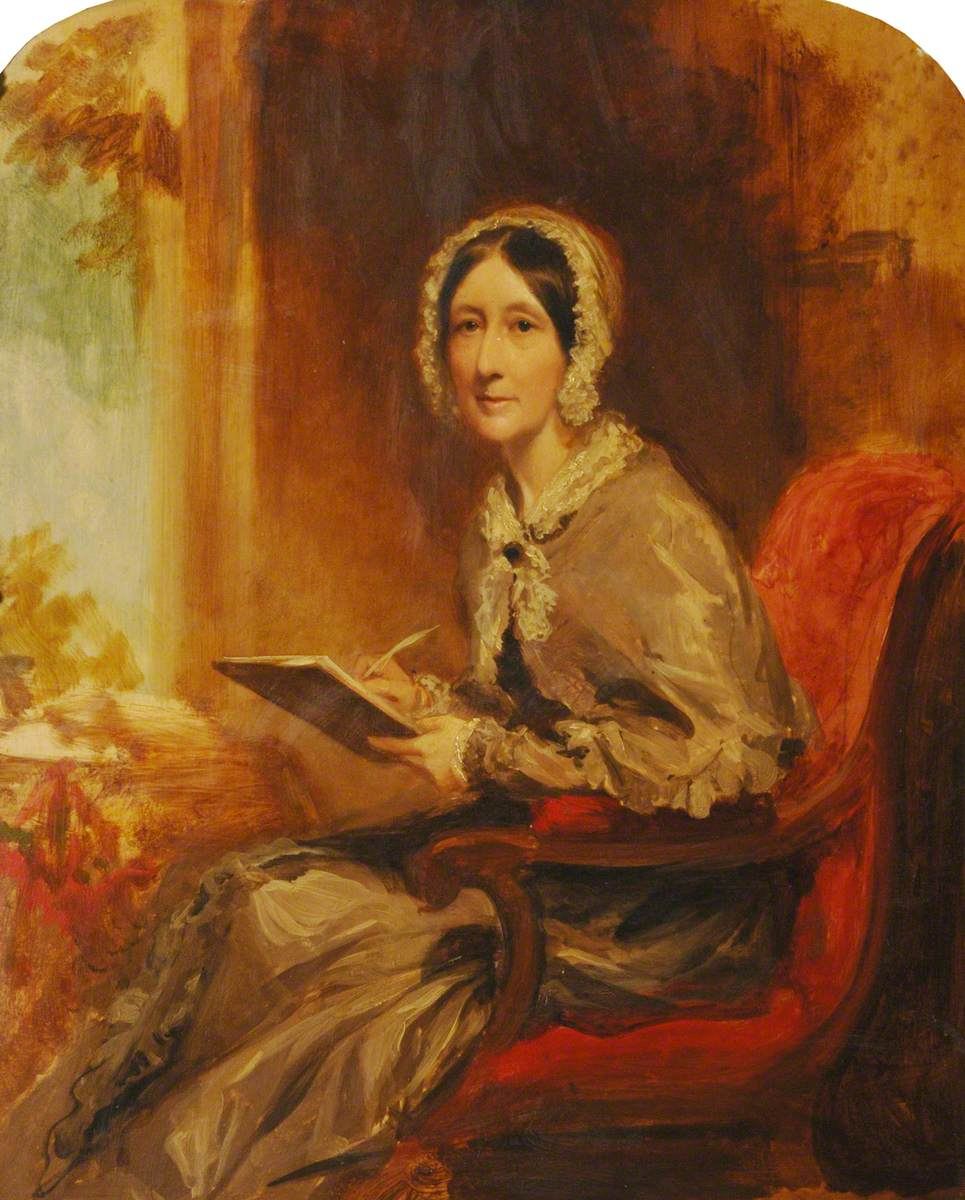
Mary Somerville, polymath, and one of the first science writers (self-portrait)

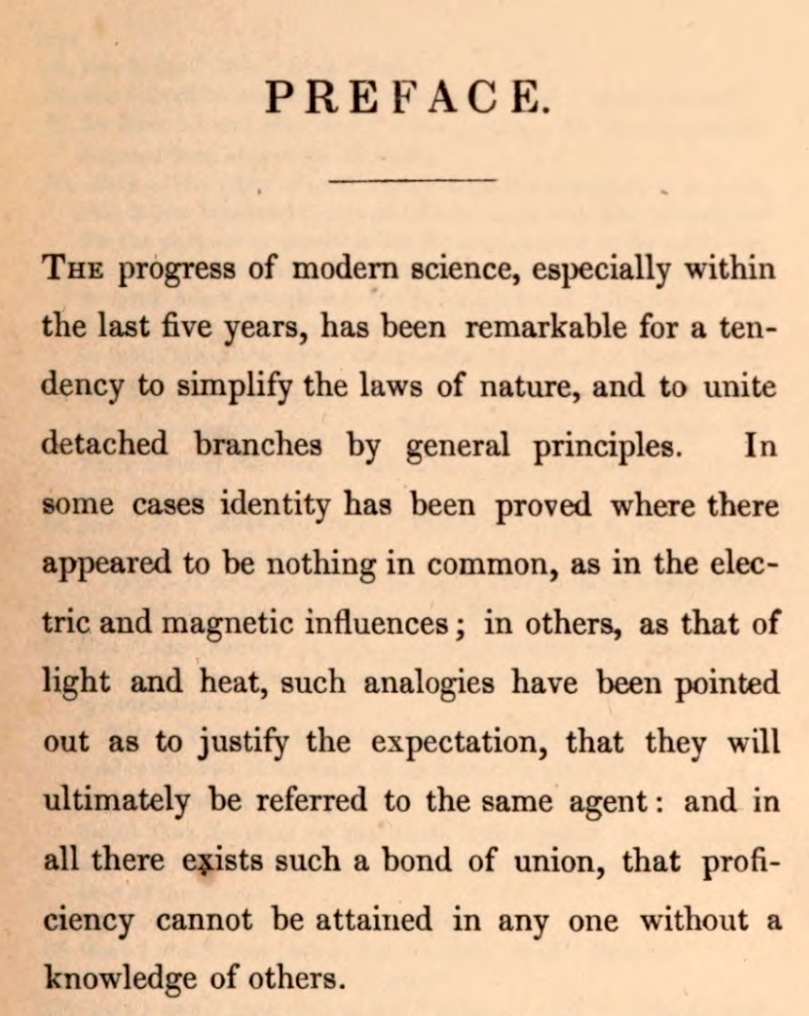
Her 1834 bestseller stressed the underlying unity of science.

Motion could generate electricity, which could generate light. "Light and heat ... will ultimately be referred to the same agent", predicted Somerville.

For Kuhn, "Mrs. Somerville's remark isolates the 'new look' that physical science had acquired between 1800 and 1835. That new look, together with the discoveries that produced it, proved to be a major requisite for the emergence of energy conservation."

=== Emergence of Energy ===
Within the space of a few years perhaps a dozen scientists, largely working independently, became convinced that heat and work are mutually interchangeable (always at same rate of exchange, which they were able to calculate). Four of them formally published their claims, supported by data: Julius von Mayer (Württemberg), James Prescott Joule (England), Ludwig A. Colding (Denmark) and Hermann von Helmholtz (Prussia). Joule's experimental proof was particularly copious.

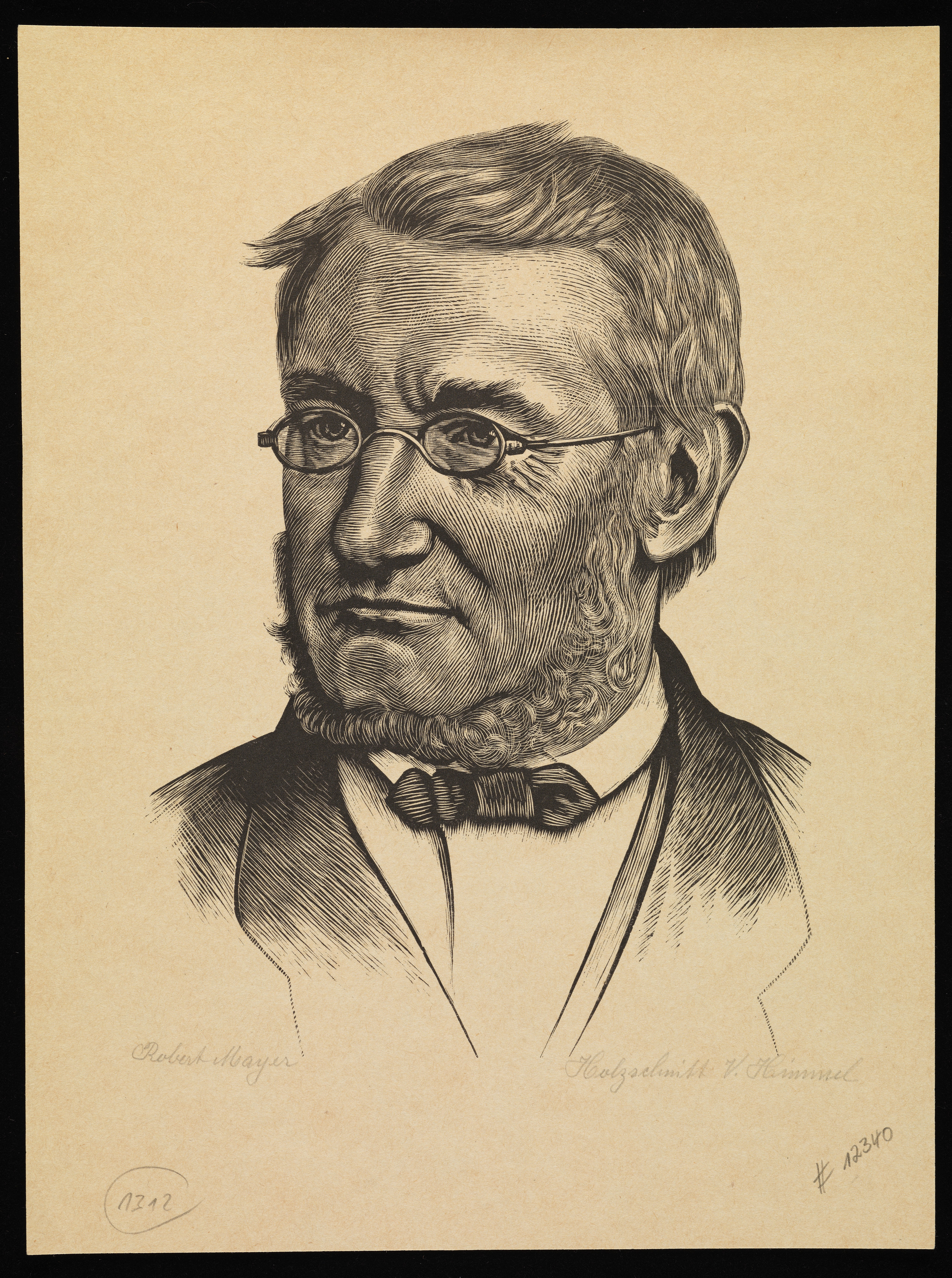
Mayer, physician

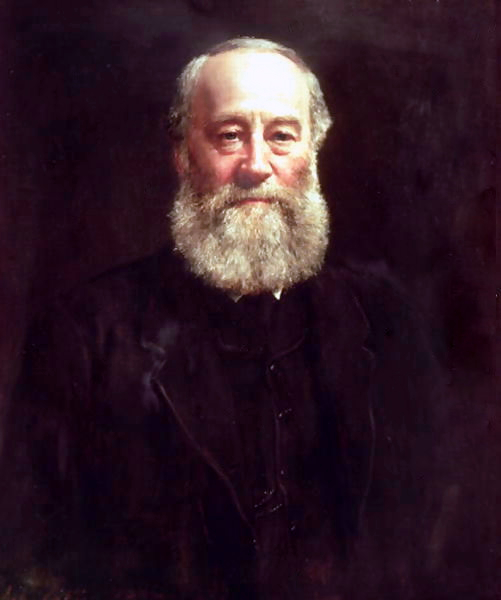
Joule, brewer

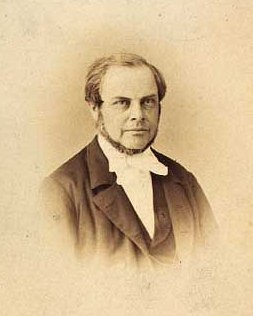
Colding, civil engineer

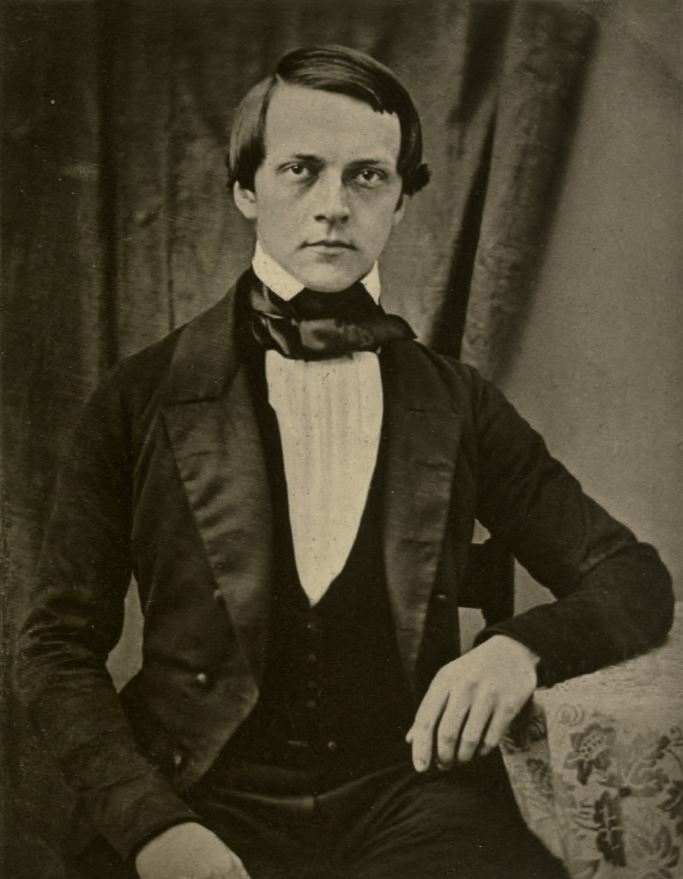
Helmholtz, physician

There is "no more striking instance" of simultaneous discovery in the history of science, wrote Thomas Kuhn. It was not heat that was conserved, but a more general thing: energy. Heat was just one manifestation of energy.

==== Obscurity ====
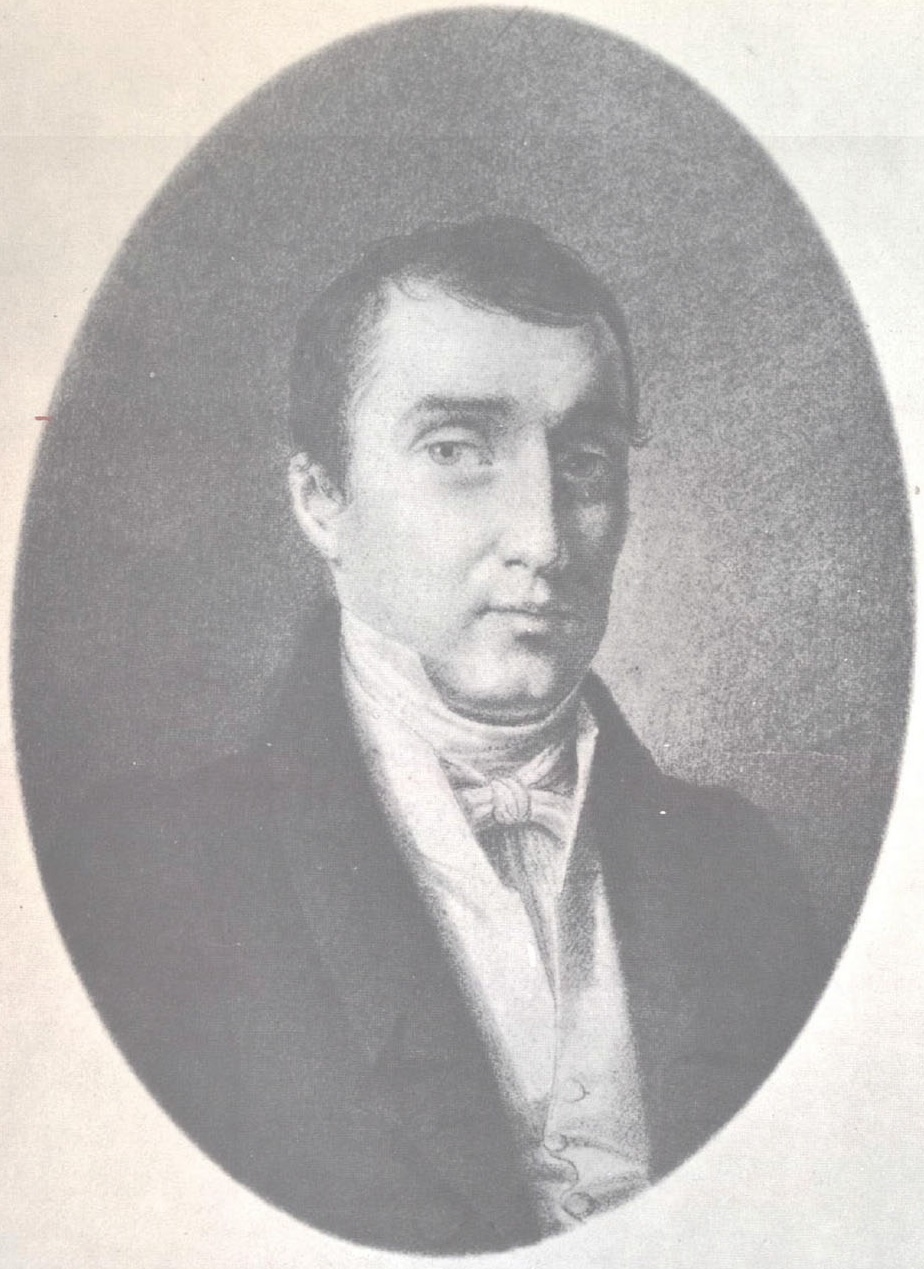
Sadi Carnot, about 2 years before his death

One of the first to come round to the dynamical theory of heat, as it was called, had been Sadi Carnot himself. From surviving notes it is known he started to have doubts about the caloric theory and, according to physicist Eric Mendoza, "by the time he came to correct the proofs of his book he had realized that the very basis of all his theorems and demonstrations was wrong". He did not live to solve the problem and publish that. It was a "sad fact that he died in a madhouse": in 1832.

His book made no discernible impact on the scientific or engineering communities of the time. One person who did read it was his friend Émile Clapeyron who rewrote the theory in a mathematical treatment and published it in a learned journal; it was translated into English.

Sadi Carnot's book fell into such obscurity that in 1845 William Thomson (the future Lord Kelvin), then a research student in Paris, was unable to find a copy. "He searched libraries, bookstores, and the stalls on the quays along the Seine, but no success... Sadi Carnot on heat was unknown".

== Rescues of Carnot's theory ==
=== Rudolf Clausius and William Thomson ===
Thomson eventually acquired Carnot’s work in Scotland. He published papers about Carnot's theory that drew it to the attention of scientists generally. It contained some important truths. Using it, Thomson was able to devise the Kelvin scale of temperature, and his brother James Thomson used it to make an important prediction about the freezing point of water under pressure that was verified experimentally. Hence Thomson was extremely reluctant to give up the caloric theory, even though his friend Joule was insisting it was wrong.

Formal authors of the Second Law of Thermodynamics

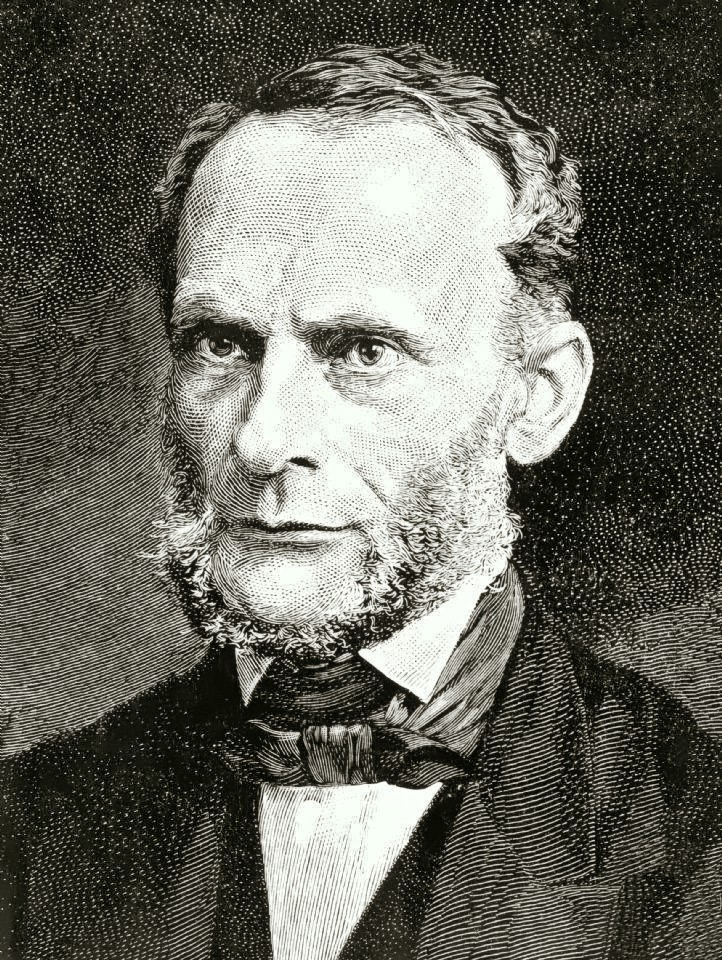
Rudolf Clausius

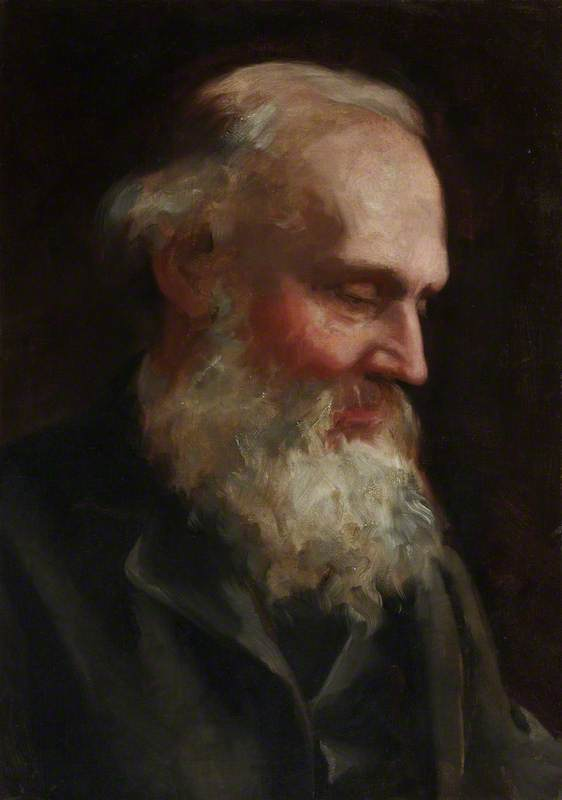
William Thomson (Lord Kelvin)

Around 1850 Rudolf Clausius (Berlin, Prussia) and William Thomson (Glasgow, Scotland) independently realised that Carnot's theory could be saved by making a new assumption about the laws of physics. Of the two, Clausius published first; Thomson conceded his priority. Their papers can be read as external links to this article. Their reasoning becomes increasingly mathematical but the key point is paraphrased later below.

=== James Clerk Maxwell ===
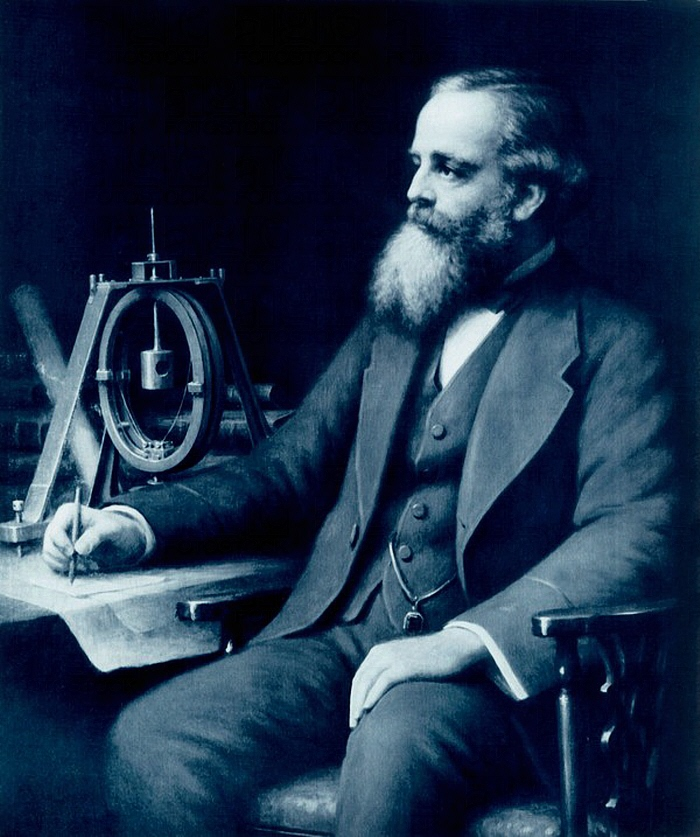
James Clerk Maxwell

The Carnot cycle as published cannot work since it is wrongly assumed that as much heat should be expelled to the cold sink as came in from the hot source. That is too much: not enough will be left in the engine to complete the cycle. A simple way to correct the mistake was described by James Clerk Maxwell in his Theory of Heat (1871). (Note: Maxwell's book went through several editions and is still in print. The relevant text has not changed for present purposes.) This was a book meant for "artisans and students" but Maxwell "did not hesitate to include discussions of the latest work in thermodynamics".

By that date French engineer Gustave-Adolphe Hirn had confirmed by experiment that, whenever an engine performs mechanical work, less heat emerges from it than goes in. The missing heat is changing into work.

But it was easy to see that the quantities (heat in vs. heat out) could not have been equal, said Maxwell. For, supposing they were, how could we explain that the engine, by doing work, can produce yet more heat — e.g. by stirring a liquid to raise its temperature? In that case the engine must somehow be producing more heat than it consumes, contrary to the doctrine that caloric cannot be created.

To fix the Carnot cycle, therefore, one must terminate the isothermal compression phase at just the right point, before too much heat has passed to the cold sink. It is easy to do this by calculation, said Maxwell, "but is still easier" by removing the sink as soon as the fluid pressure rises to its original cold-temperature value.

=== Fixing the proof ===
A deeper problem was that Carnot's proof of his central Principle was not valid either. Granted the conservation of heat, he had reasoned (above) that there could not be such a thing as a 'super' engine more efficient than a Carnot engine, or else perpetual motion would be possible. However, as Ted Jacobson noted

While Carnot's conclusion was correct, his argument contained a single deep flaw: heat is not by itself conserved! More heat flows out of the hot reservoir than flows into the colder reservoir, the difference being the work extracted.

This means that, since the 'super' engine is the more efficient of the two, it extracts more work and so passes less waste heat into the cold reservoir. Hence, when the Carnot engine is run backwards, "the cold reservoir is no longer restored to its initial state: more heat is drawn out than went in".

The leftover work, then, is not produced from nothing, but rather from the heat drawn out of the colder reservoir. While not as inadmissable [i.e. intentionally absurd] as Carnot's result, this is nevertheless inadmissable. Its impossibility is Kelvin's version of the second law of thermodynamics.

There is another way of looking at it:

Alternatively, all of the work from the more efficient engine could be used to run the less efficient engine backwards, in which case the net result would be spontaneous (but engineered) heat flow from the colder reservoir to the hotter one, in violation of Clausius' version of the second law.

== Aftermath ==
=== The Second Law ===
The drinking bird toy is a heat engine, fuelled by evaporative cooling in the head region: its cool sink. Ambient air round the tail is its warm reservoir.

Hence, Kelvin and Clausius saved the Carnot Principle by formally identifying and stating new laws of nature. The First Law of Thermodynamics is the conservation of energy. The Second Law can be encapsulated thus:

- Heat cannot flow spontaneously from cold to hot (Clausius).
- An engine cannot be run from a single heat reservoir (Kelvin)

Those are similar formulations; were long believed to be completely equivalent; but turn out not to be quite the same. A disquieting feature, which has still not been explained, is that there is no universally agreed way of stating this law, despite attempts at consensus. There have been many formulations. "And even today, the Second Law remains so obscure that it continues to attract new efforts at clarification".

==== Engineering in spite of the Second Law ====
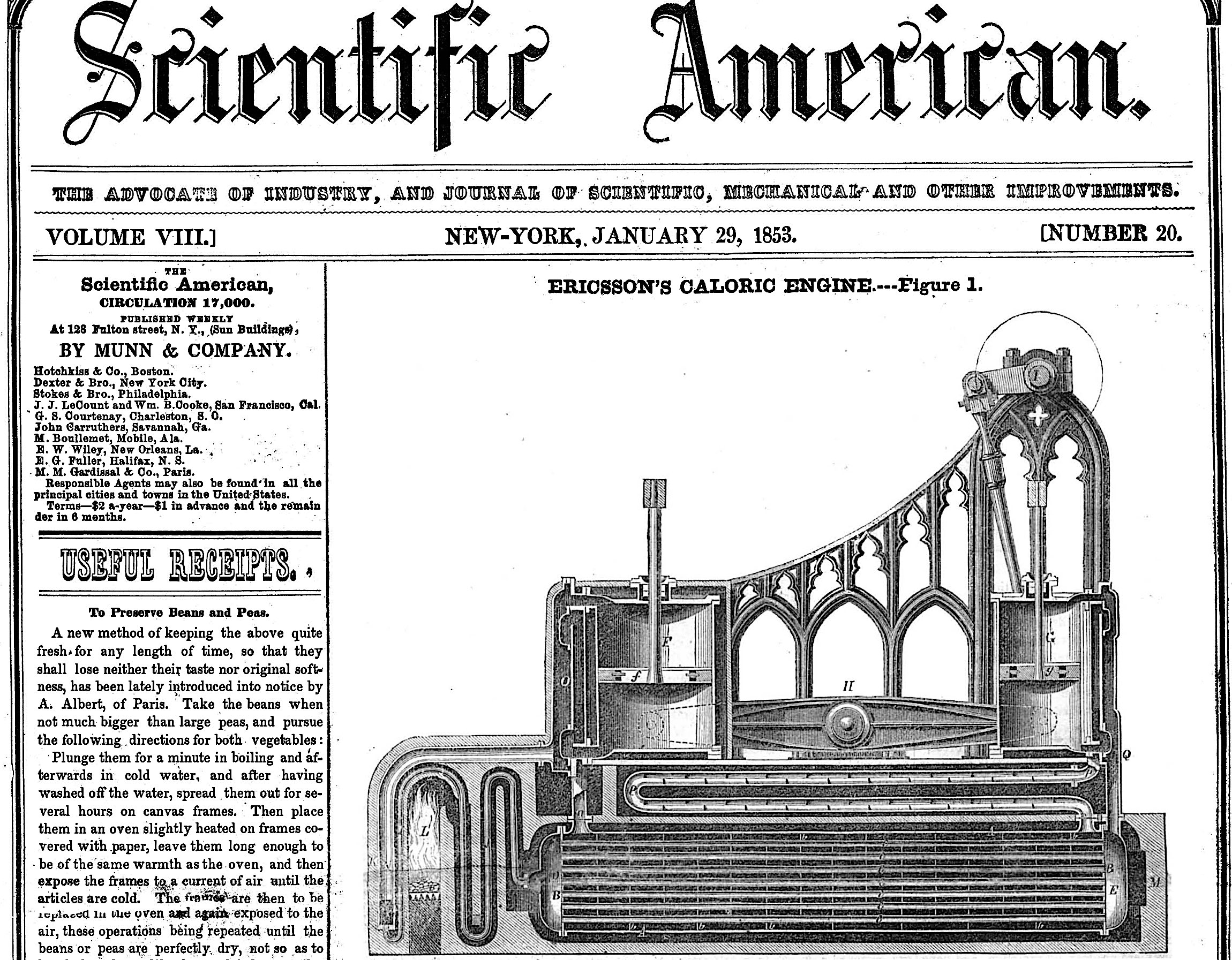
Ericsson's Caloric Engine. To save fuel, the same heat was to be used "again and again". Results were disappointing.

Only slowly did the new theory diffuse into engineering practice, and reputable technologists continued to conceive engines that were thermodynamically impossible. John Ericsson built a hot air ship's engine that (it was claimed) saved fuel by continually recycling waste heat. Called the Caloric Engine, its cylinders were 14 foot (4.3 metres) thick. According to one who believed in it:

The principle of this new engine consists in this, that the heat which is required to give motion to the engine at the commencement, is returned by a peculiar process of transfer, and thereby made to act over and over again, instead of being, as in the steam engine, thrown into a condenser, or into the atmosphere as so much waste fuel.

To which Scientific American riposted: "Let us point out its fallacious principles: it is stated that it only uses so much coal to make up the loss of radiation, therefore, if there were no loss of heat by radiation, it would use no coai at all, after the first fire; it would go on for ever — a perpetual motion surely".

==== Entropy ====
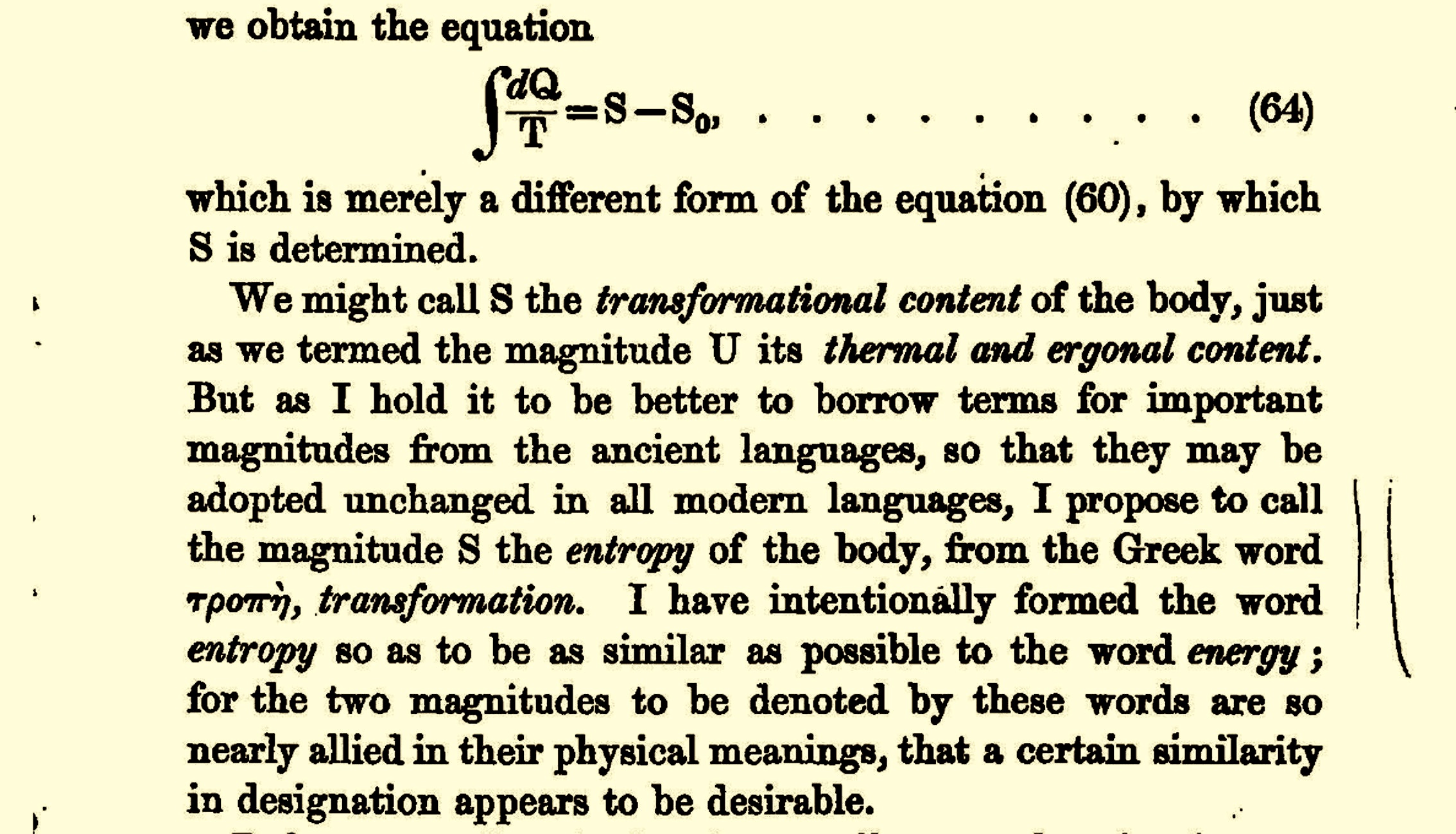
Rudolf Clausius coins the term entropy. From his Ninth Memoir, 1865 (Hirst translation)

Sadi Carnot's most important single idea may have been the completely reversible thermodynamic process. It led to the concept of entropy, whose meaning is indicated below.

The word entropy ("transformational energy") was coined by Clausius in 1865 to refer to a variable in his mathematical reasoning. It stands for something that is expressed in units of energy divided by temperature, is not directly apprehended by the human senses, and is difficult to measure experimentally, Generally, there exists a rather hazy understanding of entropy, even amongst those who have to use the concept professionally. Also the word is much misused by some scientists, educators and popular writers, if not abused by charlatans.

In the same paper Clausius summarised the laws of thermodynamics as follows:

1. The energy of the universe is constant.
2. The entropy of the universe tends to a maximum.

One way of understanding 2. is as follows:

Energy of all types [including heat] changes from being localized to becoming dispersed or spread out, if it is not hindered from doing so. The overall process is measured by the increase in thermodynamic entropy. — Frank L. Lambert

Another way to think about entropy is as a measurement of the availability of useful energy in a system. While energy cannot be created or destroyed, as the approaches equilibrium the energy of that system becomes less available for use.

The concept of entropy, though important in thermodynamics, is not necessary for an intuitive understanding of Carnot's theory. There are many formulations of the Second Law that do not mention entropy at all, including the original Clausius and Thomson versions.
