= Giuseppe Antonio Borgnis =

Italian engineer

Giuseppe Antonio Borgnis (Frenchified as Joseph Antoine Borgnis) 1781–1863, was an Italian engineer, professor of Applied mathematics and then of Architecture at the University of Pavia. His book Théorie de la mécanique usuelle is considered by historian Donald Cardwell to be one of the great engineering textbooks of the early 19th century.

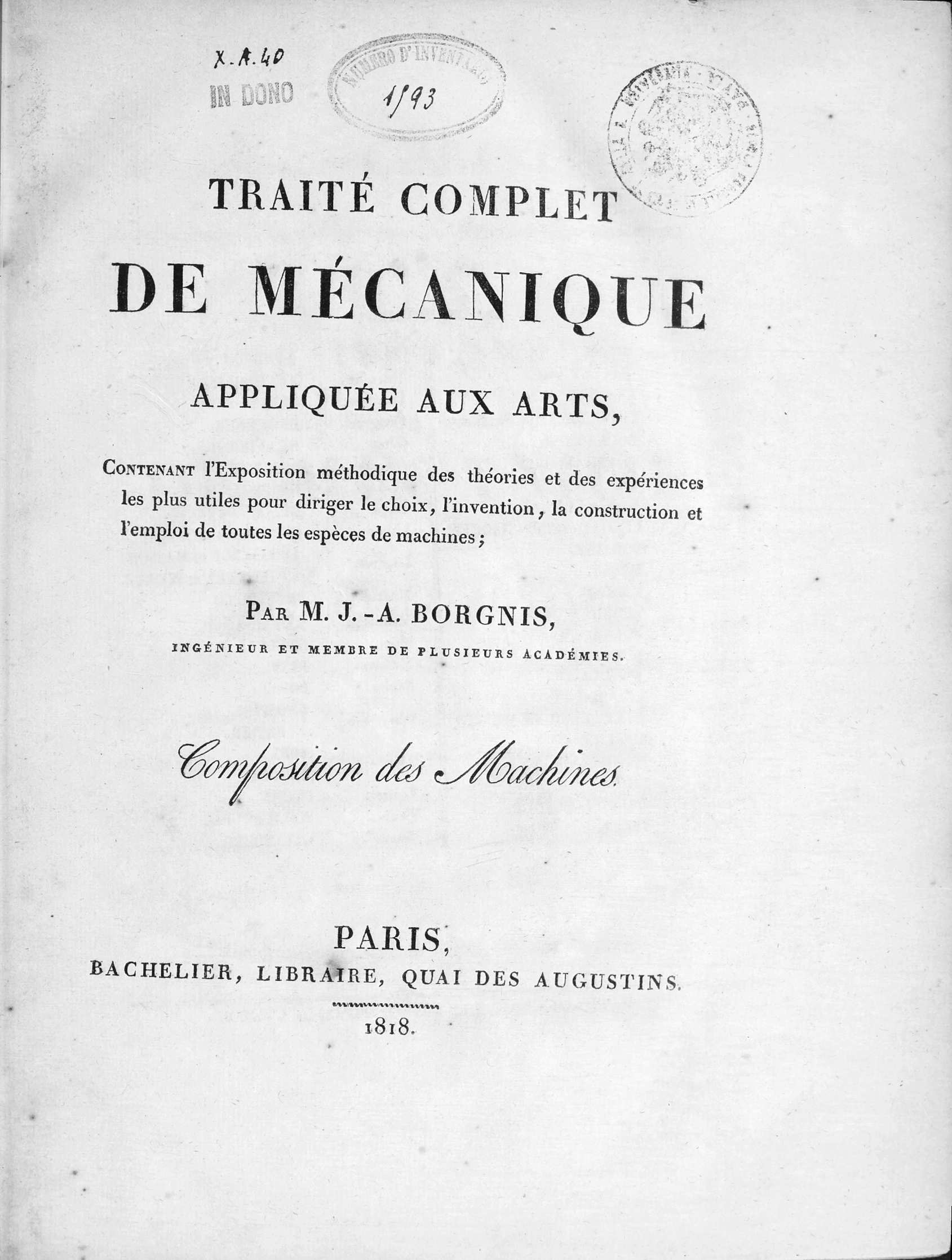
Composition des machines, 1818

== Works ==
- Traité complet de mécanique appliquée aux art, 1818
  - Composition des machines (in French). Vol. 1. Paris. 1818 – via Charles Louis Étienne Bachelier.
  - Des machines employées dans les constructions diverses (in French). Vol. 2. Paris. 1818 – via Charles Louis Étienne Bachelier.
  - Des machines employées dans diverses fabrications (in French). Vol. 3. Paris. 1819 – via Charles Louis Étienne Bachelier.
  - Mouvemens des fardeaux (in French). Vol. 4. Paris. 1818 – via Charles Louis Étienne Bachelier.
  - Des machines imitatives et des machines théâtrales (in French). Vol. 5. Paris. 1820 – via Charles Louis Étienne Bachelier.
  - Des machines qui servent a confectionner les étoffes (in French). Vol. 6. Paris. 1820 – via Charles Louis Étienne Bachelier.
  - Des machines hydrauliques (in French). Vol. 7. Paris. 1819 – via Charles Louis Étienne Bachelier.
  - Des machines d'agriculture (in French). Vol. 8. Paris. 1819 – via Charles Louis Étienne Bachelier.
- Théorie de la mécanique usuelle, ou Introduction à l'étude de la mécanique appliquée aux arts, 1821.
- Traité élémentaire de construction appliquée à l'architecture civile, 1823; 1838.
- Dictionnaire de mécanique appliquée aux arts, 1823.
- Elementi di statica architettonica, 1842.
