= Clausius theorem =

Version of the second law of thermodynamics

The Clausius theorem, also known as the Clausius inequality, states that for a thermodynamic system (e.g. heat engine or heat pump) exchanging heat with external thermal reservoirs and undergoing a thermodynamic cycle, the following inequality holds.

$$-\oint dS_\text{Res} = \oint \frac{\delta Q}{T_{\text{surr}}} \leq 0,$$

where $\oint dS_\text{Res}$ is the total entropy change in the external thermal reservoirs (surroundings), $\delta Q$ is an infinitesimal amount of heat that is taken from the reservoirs and absorbed by the system ($\delta Q > 0$ if heat from the reservoirs is absorbed by the system, and $\delta Q$ < 0 if heat is leaving from the system to the reservoirs) and $T_{\text{surr}}$ is the common temperature of the reservoirs at a particular instant in time. The closed integral is carried out along a thermodynamic process path from the initial/final state to the same initial/final state (thermodynamic cycle). In principle, the closed integral can start and end at an arbitrary point along the path.

The Clausius theorem or inequality implies $\oint dS_\text{Res} \geq 0$ per thermodynamic cycle, meaning that the entropy of the reservoirs increases or does not change, and never decreases, per cycle.

For multiple thermal reservoirs with different temperatures $\left(T_1, T_2, \dots, T_N\right)$ interacting a thermodynamic system undergoing a thermodynamic cycle, the Clausius inequality can be written as the following for expression clarity:

$$-\oint dS_\text{Res} = \oint \left(\sum_{n=1}^N\frac{\delta Q_n}{T_n}\right) \leq 0.$$

where $\delta Q_n$ is an infinitesimal heat from the reservoir $n$ to the system.

In the special case of a reversible process, the equality holds, and the reversible case is used to introduce the state function known as entropy. This is because in a cyclic process the variation of a state function is zero per cycle, so the fact that this integral is equal to zero per cycle in a reversible process implies that there is some function (entropy) whose infinitesimal change is $\frac{\delta Q}{T}$.

The generalized "inequality of Clausius"

$$dS_{\text{sys}} \geq \frac{\delta Q}{T_{\text{surr}}}$$

for $dS_{\text{sys}}$ as an infinitesimal change in entropy of a system (denoted by sys) under consideration applies not only to cyclic processes, but to any process that occurs in a closed system.

The Clausius inequality is a consequence of applying the second law of thermodynamics at each infinitesimal stage of heat transfer. The Clausius statement states that it is impossible to construct a device whose sole effect is the transfer of heat from a cool reservoir to a hot reservoir. Equivalently, heat spontaneously flows from a hot body to a cooler one, not the other way around.

== History ==
The Clausius theorem is a mathematical representation of the second law of thermodynamics. It was developed by Rudolf Clausius who intended to explain the relationship between the heat flow in a system and the entropy of the system and its surroundings. Clausius developed this in his efforts to explain entropy and define it quantitatively. In more direct terms, the theorem gives us a way to determine if a cyclical process is reversible or irreversible. The Clausius theorem provides a quantitative formula for understanding the second law.

Clausius was one of the first to work on the idea of entropy and is even responsible for giving it that name. What is now known as the Clausius theorem was first published in 1862 in Clausius' sixth memoir, "On the Application of the Theorem of the Equivalence of Transformations to Interior Work". Clausius sought to show a proportional relationship between entropy and the energy flow by heating (δQ) into a system. In a system, this heat energy can be transformed into work, and work can be transformed into heat through a cyclical process. Clausius writes that "The algebraic sum of all the transformations occurring in a cyclical process can only be less than zero, or, as an extreme case, equal to nothing." In other words, the equation

$$\oint \frac{\delta Q}{T} = 0$$

with 𝛿Q being energy flow into the system due to heating and T being absolute temperature of the body when that energy is absorbed, is found to be true for any process that is cyclical and reversible. Clausius then took this a step further and determined that the following relation must be found true for any cyclical process that is possible, reversible or not. This relation is the "Clausius inequality",

$$\oint \frac{\delta Q}{T_\text{surr}} \leq 0$$

where $\delta Q$ is an infinitesimal amount of heat that is taken from the thermal reservoir interacting with the system and absorbed by the system ($\delta Q > 0$ if heat from the reservoir is absorbed by the system, and $\delta Q$ < 0 if heat is leaving from the system to the reservoir) and $T_{\text{surr}}$ is the temperature of the reservoir at a particular instant in time. Now that this is known, there must be a relation developed between the Clausius inequality and entropy. The amount of entropy S added to the system during the cycle is defined as

$$\Delta S {{=}} \oint \frac{\delta Q}{T}$$

It has been determined, as stated in the second law of thermodynamics, that the entropy is a state function: It depends only upon the state that the system is in, and not what path the system took to get there. This is in contrast to the amount of energy added as heat (𝛿Q) and as work (𝛿W), which may vary depending on the path. In a cyclic process, therefore, the entropy of the system at the beginning of the cycle must equal to the entropy at the end of the cycle (because the entropy is a state function), $\Delta S=0$, regardless of whether the process is reversible or irreversible. In irreversible cases, the net entropy is added to the system reservoirs $(\Delta S_\text{surr}>0)$ per thermodynamic cycle while in reversible cases, no entropy is created or added to the reservoirs.

If the amount of energy added by heating can be measured during the process, and the temperature can be measured during the process, then the Clausius inequality can be used to determine whether the process is reversible or irreversible by carrying out the integration in the Clausius inequality. If integral result is equal to zero then it is a reversible process, while if greater than zero then an irreversible process (less than zero cannot be possible).

== Proof ==
The temperature that enters in the denominator of the integrand in the Clausius inequality is the temperature of the external thermal reservoir with which the system exchanges heat. At each instant of the process, the system is in contact with an external reservoir.

Because of the Second Law of Thermodynamics, in each infinitesimal heat exchange process between the system and the reservoirs, the net change in entropy of the "universe", so to say, is $dS_\text{Total} = dS_\text{Sys} + dS_\text{Res} \geq 0$, where Sys and Res stand for System and Reservoir, respectively.

In the proof of the Clausius theorem or inequality, a sign convention of heat is used; in the perspective of an object under consideration, when heat is absorbed by the object then the heat is positive, while when heat leaves from the object then the heat is negative.

When the system takes heat from a hotter (hot) reservoir by an infinitesimal amount $\delta Q_{1}$($\geq 0$), for the net change in entropy $dS_{\text{Total}_{1}}$ to be positive or zero (i.e., non-negative) in this step (called the step 1 here) to fulfill the Second Law of Thermodynamics, the temperature of the hot reservoir $T_\text{Hot}$ needs to be equal to or greater than the temperature of the system at that instant; if the temperature of the system is given by $T_{1}$ at that instant, then $dS_{\text{Sys}_{1}} = \frac{\delta Q_{1}}{T_{1}}$ as the entropy change in the system at the instant, and $T_\text{Hot}\geq T_{1}$ forces us to have:

$$-dS_{\text{Res}_{1}} =\frac{\delta Q_{1}}{T_\text{Hot}}\leq \frac{\delta Q_{1}}{T_{1}} = dS_{\text{Sys}_{1}}$$

This means the magnitude of the entropy "loss" from the hot reservoir, $\left|dS_{\text{Res}_{1}}\right| = \frac{\delta Q_{1}}{T_\text{Hot}}$ is equal to or less than the magnitude of the entropy "gain" $dS_{\text{Sys}_{1}} = \frac{\delta Q_{1}}{T_{1}}$($\geq 0$) by the system, so the net entropy change $dS_{\text{Total}_{1}}$ is zero or positive.

Similarly, when the system at temperature $T_{2}$ expels heat in magnitude $\left | \delta Q_{2} \right | = -\delta Q_{2}$ ($\delta Q_{2}\leq 0$) into a colder (cold) reservoir (at temperature $T_\text{Cold}\leq T_{2}$) in an infinitesimal step (called the step 2), then again, for the Second Law of Thermodynamics to hold, one would have, in a very similar manner:
$$-dS_{\text{Res}_{2}}=\frac{\delta Q_{2}}{T_\text{Cold}}\leq \frac{\delta Q_{2}}{T_{2}}= dS_{\text{Sys}_{2}}$$
Here, the amount of heat 'absorbed' by the system is given by $\delta Q_{2}$ $\leq 0$, signifying that heat is actually transferring (leaving) from the system to the cold reservoir, with $dS_{\text{Sys}_{2}}\leq 0$. The magnitude of the entropy gained by the cold reservoir $dS_{\text{Res}_{2}} = - \frac{\delta Q_{2}}{T_\text{cold}}$ is equal to or greater than the magnitude of the entropy loss of the system $\left|dS_{\text{Sys}_{2}}\right|$, so the net entropy change $dS_{\text{Total}_{2}}$ is also zero or positive in this case.

Because the total change in entropy for the system is zero in a thermodynamic cyclic process where all state functions of the system are reset or returned to initial values (values at the process starts) upon the completion of each cycle, if one adds all the infinitesimal steps of heat intake from and heat expulsion to the reservoirs, signified by the previous two equations, with the temperature of each reservoir at each instant given by $T_\text{surr}$, one gets

$$-\oint dS_\text{Res}= \oint \frac{\delta Q}{T_\text{surr}}\leq \oint dS_\text{Sys} = 0.$$

In particular,

$$\oint \frac{\delta Q}{T_\text{surr}}\leq 0,$$

which was to be proven (and is now proven).

In summary, (the inequality in the third statement below, being obviously guaranteed by the second law of thermodynamics, which is the basis of our calculation),

$$\oint dS_\text{Res}\geq 0,$$
$\oint dS_\text{Sys}=0$ (as a cyclic process),
$$\oint dS_\text{Total}=\oint dS_\text{Res}+\oint dS_\text{Sys}\geq 0.$$

For a reversible cyclic process, there is no generation of entropy in each of the infinitesimal heat transfer processes since there is practically no temperature difference between the system and the thermal reservoirs (I.e., the system entropy change and the reservoirs entropy change is equal in magnitude and opposite in sign at any instant.), so the following equality holds,

$$\oint \frac{\delta Q_\text{rev}}{T}=0,$$
$$\oint dS_\text{Res} = 0,$$
$\oint dS_\text{Sys}=0$ (as a cyclic process),
$$\oint dS_\text{Total}=\oint dS_\text{Res}+\oint dS_\text{Sys} = 0.$$

The Clausius inequality is a consequence of applying the second law of thermodynamics at each infinitesimal stage of heat transfer, and is thus in a sense a weaker condition than the Second Law itself.

== Heat engine efficiency ==
In the heat engine model with two thermal reservoirs (hot and cold reservoirs), the limit of the efficiency of any heat engine $\eta =\frac W{Q_1}$, where $W$ and $Q_1$ are work done by the heat engine and heat transferred from the hot thermal reservoir to the engine, respectively, can be derived by the first law of thermodynamics (i.e., the law of conservation of energy) and the Clausius theorem or inequality.

In respecting the abovementioned sign convention of heat,

$$Q_1 + Q_2 = W \to \eta =\frac W{Q_1} = 1 + \frac{Q_2}{Q_1}$$,

where $Q_2$ is heat transferred from the engine to the cold reservoir.

The Clausius inequality $\frac{Q_1}{T_1}+\frac{Q_2}{T_2} \le 0$ can be expressed as $\frac{Q_2}{Q_1} \le -\frac{T_2}{T_1}$. By substituting this inequality to the above equation results in,

$$\eta =\frac W{Q_1} \le 1-\frac{T_2}{T_1}$$.

This is the limit of heat engine efficiencies, and the equality of this expression is what is called the Carnot efficiency, that is the efficiency of all reversible heat engines and the maximum efficiency of all heat engines.

== See also ==
- Kelvin-Planck statement
- Carnot's theorem (thermodynamics)
- Carnot heat engine
- Introduction to entropy
