= D. S. L. Cardwell =

Historian of Science and Technology (1919–98)

- Born: 4 August 1919; Gibraltar
- Died: 8 May 1998 (aged 78); Macclesfield, Cheshire
- Education: Plymouth College, King's College, London
- Spouse: Olive Pumphrey (m. 1953)
- Children: 3

Donald Stephen Lowell Cardwell (4 August 1919 – 8 May 1998) was a historian of science and technology, Professor of the History of science at UMIST from 1974 to 1984 and Secretary and President of the Manchester Literary and Philosophical Society.

== Early life and education ==
Cardwell was born in Gibraltar in 1919, the son of a civil servant from Croydon, Surrey. He was educated at Plymouth College and gained a First-Class degree in Physics at King's College London in 1939. During the Second World War, he joined the Admiralty Signals Establishment, serving in Scotland, West Africa and the Middle East. Post-war he returned to King's College London to study for a PhD in Physics working with Bill Seeds, John Randall and Maurice Wilkins.

== Academic career ==
Cardwell worked at Keele University for two years c.1955 with the economist Bruce Williams, then at the University of Leeds before joining UMIST as Reader in the History of Science and Technology in 1963. He was promoted to professor in 1974 and retired in 1984.

He was involved with Richard L. Hills (the first curator) in laying the groundwork for the creation of Manchester’s Museum of Science and Industry (opened in 1969), and was also Secretary (1971–85) then President (1991–93) of the Manchester Literary and Philosophical Society. The Society held a Memorial Lecture in his honour in 1999.

Cardwell's papers are held at the University of Manchester Library.

== Personal life ==
Cardwell married Olive Pumphrey in 1953. They had two sons, one of whom predeceased him, and one daughter.

== Select bibliography ==
- The Organisation of Science in England (1957).
- John Dalton and the Progress of Science (1968).
- Turning Points in Western Technology: A Study of Technology, Science, and History (1972)
- Artisan to Graduate (1974).
- James Joule: a biography (1989).
- The Fontana History of Technology (1994).

Professional and academic associations
Preceded by P. G. Livesey	President of the Manchester Literary and Philosophical Society; 1991–93	Succeeded by Edward Fletcher Cass
Preceded by Dr R. G. Cox	Secretary of the Manchester Literary and Philosophical Society; 1971–85	Succeeded by Albert Leslie Smyth
