= Ericsson cycle =

Type of thermodynamic cycle

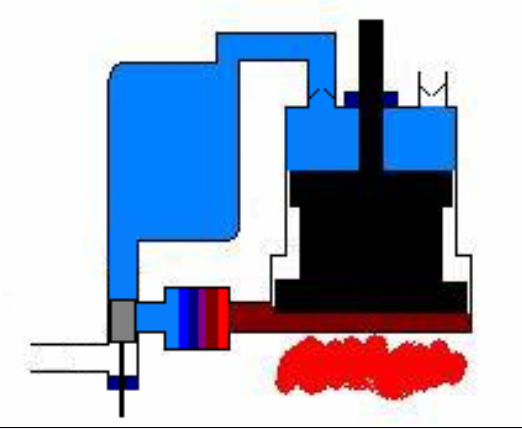
Rendering of an Ericsson engine. A cold gaseous working fluid, such as atmospheric air (shown in blue), enters the cylinder via a non-return valve at the top-right. The air is compressed by the piston (black) as the piston moves upward. The compressed air is stored in the pneumatic tank (at left). A two-way valve (gray) moves downward to allow pressurized air to pass through the regenerator where it is preheated. The air then enters the space below the piston, which is an externally heated expansion-chamber. The air expands and does work on the piston as it moves upward. After the expansion stroke, the two-way valve moves upward, thus closing off the tank and opening the exhaust port. As the piston moves back downward in the exhaust stroke, hot air is pushed back through the regenerator, which reclaims most of the heat, before passing out the exhaust port (left) as cool air.

The Ericsson cycle is named after inventor John Ericsson who designed and built many unique heat engines based on various thermodynamic cycles. He is credited with inventing two unique heat engine cycles and developing practical engines based on these cycles. His first cycle is now known as the closed Brayton cycle, while his second cycle is what is now called the Ericsson cycle. Ericsson is one of the few who built open-cycle engines, but he also built closed-cycle ones.

== Ideal Ericsson cycle ==
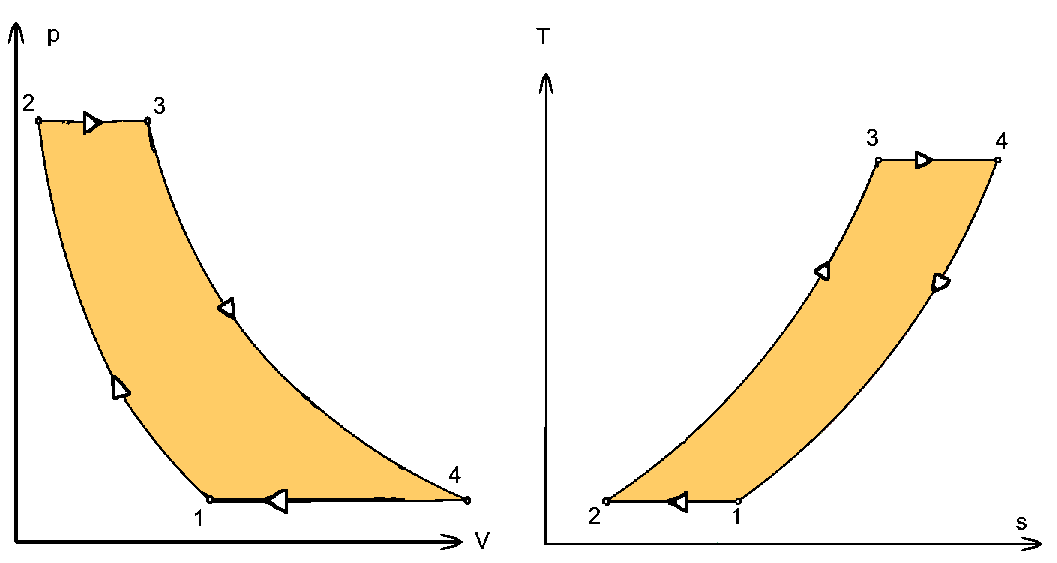
Ideal Ericsson cycle

The following is a list of the four processes that occur between the four stages of the ideal Ericsson cycle:

- Process 1 -> 2: Isothermal compression. The compression space is assumed to be intercooled, so the gas undergoes isothermal compression. The compressed air flows into a storage tank at constant pressure. In the ideal cycle, there is no heat transfer across the tank walls.
- Process 2 -> 3: Isobaric heat addition. From the tank, the compressed air flows through the regenerator and picks up heat at a high constant-pressure on the way to the heated power-cylinder.
- Process 3 -> 4: Isothermal expansion. The power-cylinder expansion-space is heated externally, and the gas undergoes isothermal expansion.
- Process 4 -> 1: Isobaric heat removal. Before the air is released as exhaust, it is passed back through the regenerator, thus cooling the gas at a low constant pressure, and heating the regenerator for the next cycle.

=== Comparison with Carnot, Diesel, Otto, and Stirling cycles ===
The ideal Otto and Diesel cycles are not totally reversible because they involve heat transfer through a finite temperature difference during the irreversible isochoric/isobaric heat-addition and isochoric heat-rejection processes. The aforementioned irreversibility renders the thermal efficiency of these cycles less than that of a Carnot engine operating within the same limits of temperature. Another cycle that features isobaric heat-addition and heat-rejection processes is the Ericsson cycle. The Ericsson cycle is an altered version of the Carnot cycle in which the two isentropic processes featured in the Carnot cycle are replaced by two isothermal regeneration processes.

The Ericsson cycle is often compared with the Stirling cycle, since the engine designs based on these respective cycles are both external combustion engines with regenerators. The Ericsson is perhaps most similar to the so-called "double-acting" type of Stirling engine, in which the displacer piston also acts as the power piston. Theoretically, both of these cycles have so called ideal efficiency, which is the highest allowed by the second law of thermodynamics. The most well-known ideal cycle is the Carnot cycle, although a useful Carnot engine is not known to have been invented. The theoretical efficiencies for both, Ericsson and Stirling cycles acting in the same limits are equal to the Carnot Efficiency for same limits.

=== Comparison with the Brayton cycle ===
The first cycle Ericsson developed is now called the "Brayton cycle", commonly applied to gas turbine engines.

The second Ericsson cycle is the cycle most commonly referred to as simply the "Ericsson cycle". The (second) Ericsson cycle is also the limit of an ideal gas-turbine Brayton cycle, operating with multistage intercooled compression, and multistage expansion with reheat and regeneration. Compared to the Brayton cycle which uses adiabatic compression and expansion, the second Ericsson cycle uses isothermal compression and expansion, thus producing more net work per stroke. Also the use of regeneration in the Ericsson cycle increases efficiency by reducing the required heat input. For further comparisons of thermodynamic cycles, see heat engine.

Cycle/Process	Compression	Heat addition	Expansion	Heat rejection
Ericsson (First, 1833)	adiabatic	isobaric	adiabatic	isobaric
Ericsson (Second, 1853)	isothermal	isobaric	isothermal	isobaric
Brayton (Turbine)	adiabatic	isobaric	adiabatic	isobaric

== Ericsson engine ==
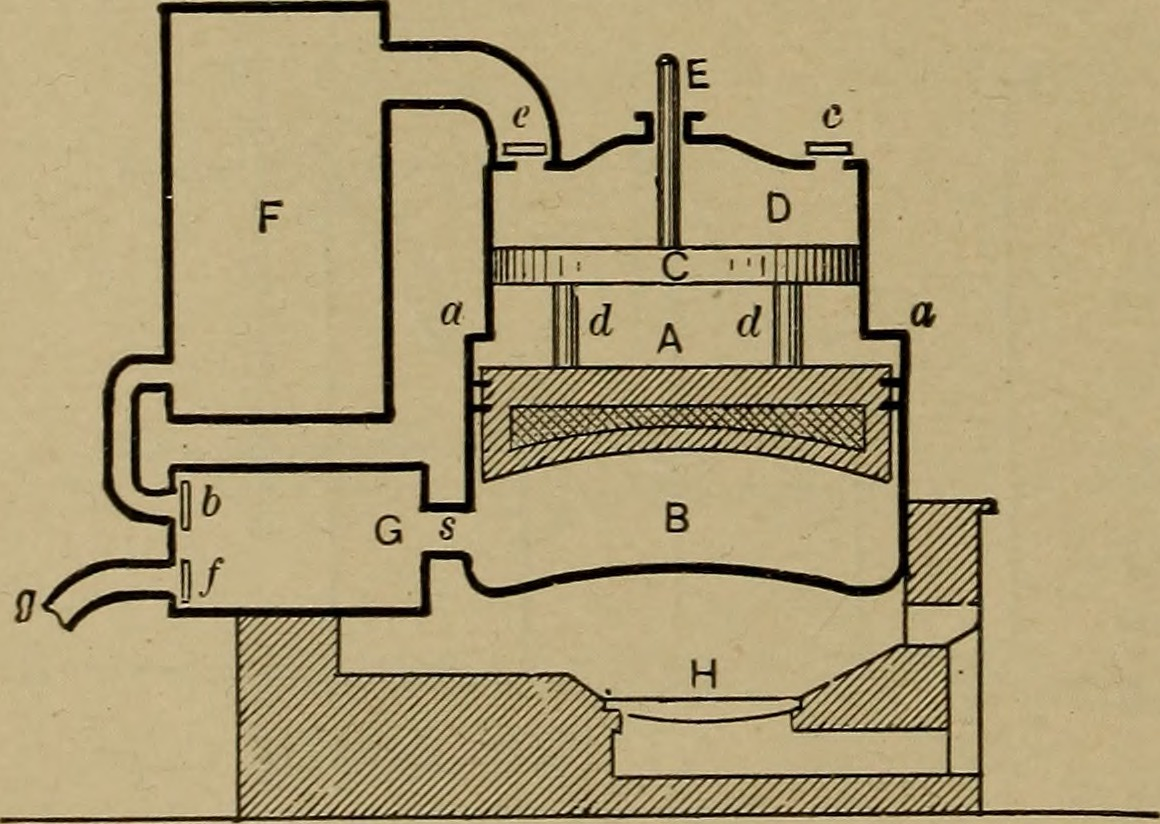
Ericsson Caloric engine

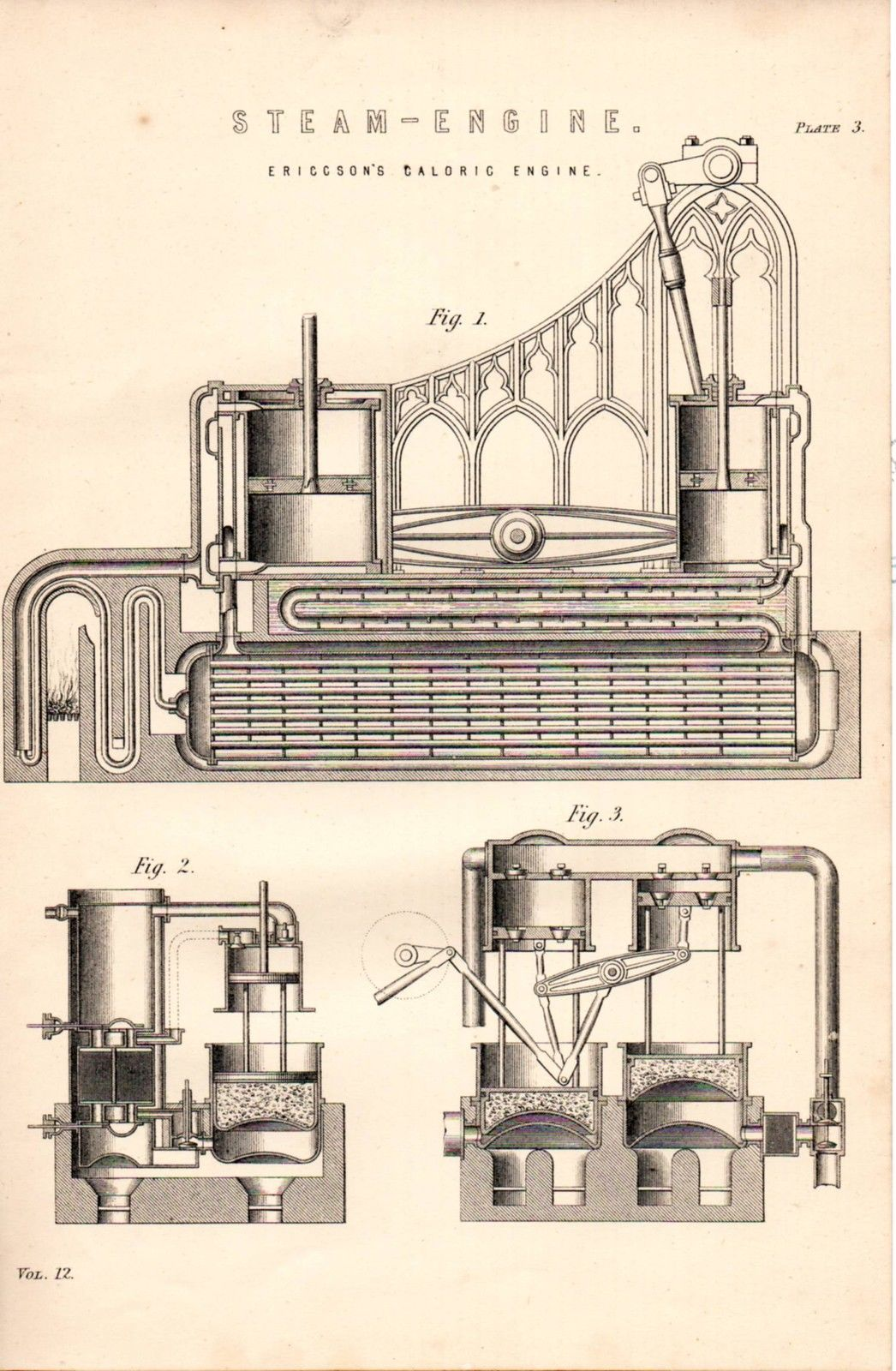
Ericsson Caloric Engine

The Ericsson engine is based on the Ericsson cycle, and is known as an "external combustion engine", because it is externally heated. To improve efficiency, the engine has a regenerator or recuperator between the compressor and the expander. The engine can be run open- or closed-cycle. Expansion occurs simultaneously with compression, on opposite sides of the piston.

== Regenerator ==
Ericsson coined the term "regenerator" for his independent invention of the mixed-flow counter-current heat exchanger. However, Rev. Robert Stirling had invented the same device, prior to Ericsson, so the invention is credited to Stirling. Stirling called it an "economiser" or "economizer", because it increased the fuel economy of various types of heat processes. The invention was found to be useful, in many other devices and systems, where it became more widely used, since other types of engines became favored over the Stirling engine. The term "regenerator" is now the name given to the component in the Stirling engine.

The term "recuperator" refers to a separated-flow, counter-current heat exchanger. As if this weren't confusing enough, a mixed-flow regenerator is sometimes used as a quasi-separated-flow recuperator. This can be done through the use of moving valves, or by a rotating regenerates with fixed baffles, or by the use of other moving parts. When heat is recovered from exhaust gases and used to preheat combustion air, typically the term recuperator is used, because the two flows are separate.

== History ==
In 1791, before Ericsson, John Barber proposed a similar engine. The Barber engine used a bellows compressor and a turbine expander, but it lacked a regenerator/recuperator. There are no records of a working Barber engine. Ericsson invented and patented his first engine using an external version of the Brayton cycle in 1833 (number 6409/1833 British). This was 18 years before Joule and 43 years before Brayton. Brayton engines were all piston engines and for the most part, internal combustion versions of the un-recuperated Ericsson engine. The "Brayton cycle" is now known as the gas turbine cycle, which differs from the original "Brayton cycle" in the use of a turbine compressor and expander. The gas turbine cycle is used for all modern gas turbine and turbojet engines, however simple cycle turbines are often recuperated to improve efficiency and these recuperated turbines more closely resemble Ericsson's work.

Ericsson eventually abandoned the open cycle in favor of the traditional closed Stirling cycle.

Ericsson's engine can easily be modified to operate in a closed-cycle mode, using a second, lower-pressure, cooled container between the original exhaust and intake. In closed cycle, the lower pressure can be significantly above ambient pressure, and He or H_{2} working gas can be used. Because of the higher pressure difference between the upward and downward movement of the work-piston, specific output can be greater than of a valveless Stirling engine. The added cost is the valve. Ericsson's engine also minimizes mechanical losses: the power necessary for compression does not go through crank-bearing frictional losses, but is applied directly from the expansion force. The piston-type Ericsson engine can potentially be the highest efficiency heat engine arrangement ever constructed. Admittedly, this has yet to be proven in practical applications.

Ericsson designed and built a number of engines running on various cycles including steam, Stirling, Brayton, externally heated diesel air fluid cycle. He ran his engines on a great variety of fuels including coal and solar heat.

Ericsson was also responsible for an early use of the screw propeller for ship propulsion, in the USS Princeton, built in 1842–43.

=== Caloric ship Ericsson ===
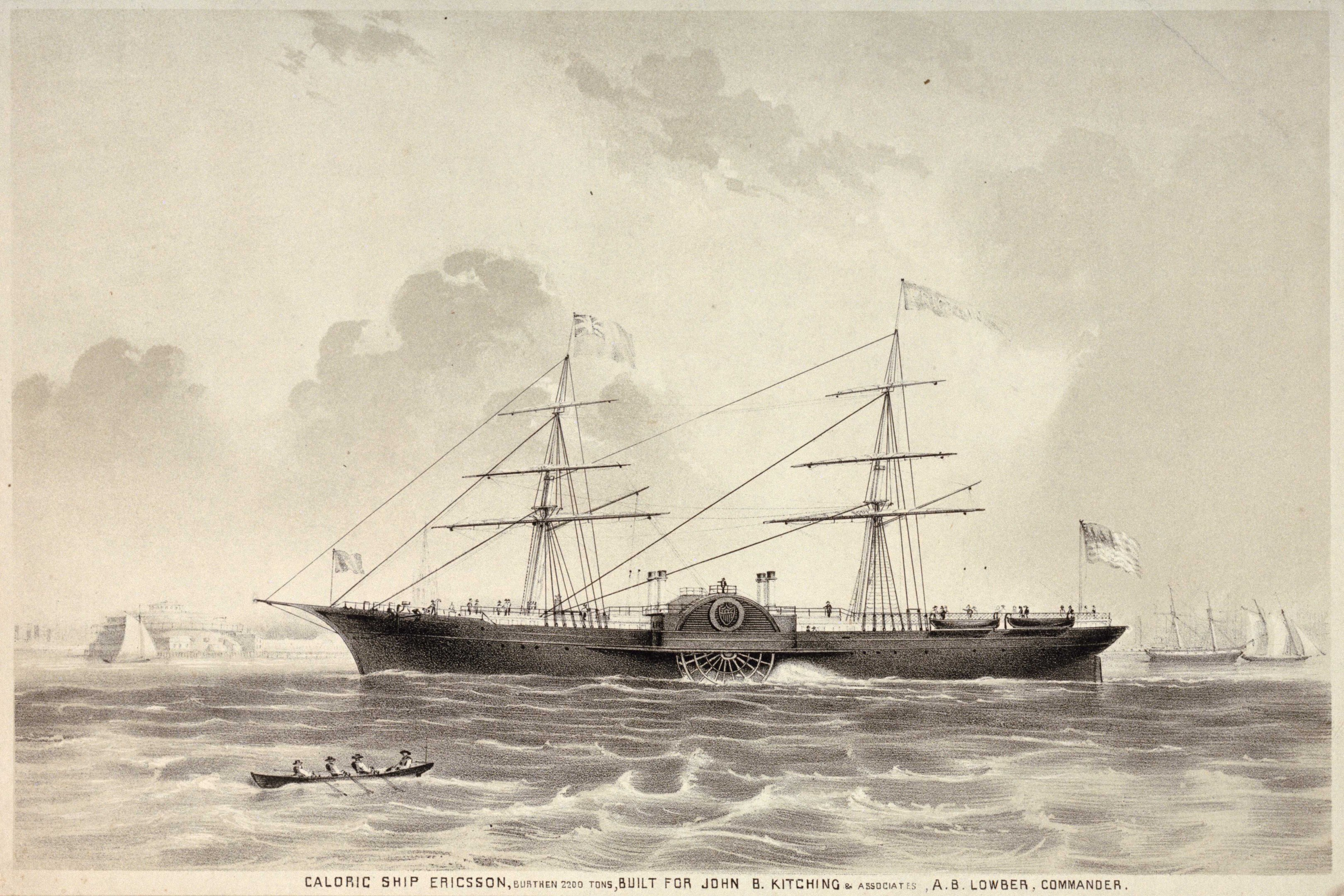
Drawing of Ericsson ship

In 1851 the Ericsson-cycle engine (the second of the two discussed here) was used to power a 2,000-ton ship, the caloric ship Ericsson (48.830379°N 125.243956°W), and ran flawlessly for 73 hours. The combination engine produced about 300 horsepower (220 kW). It had a combination of four dual-piston engines; the larger expansion piston/cylinder, at 14 feet (4.3 m) in diameter, was perhaps the largest piston ever built. Rumor has it that tables were placed on top of those pistons (obviously in the cool compression chamber, not the hot power chamber) and dinner was served and eaten, while the engine was running at full power. At 6.5 RPM the pressure was limited to 8 psi (55 kPa).

According to the official report it only consumed 4200 kg coal per 24 hours (original target was 8000 kg, which is still better than contemporary steam engines). The one sea trial proved that even though the engine ran well, the ship was underpowered. Some time after the trials, the Ericsson sank. When it was raised, the Ericsson-cycle engine was removed and a steam engine took its place. The ship was wrecked when blown aground in November 1892 at the entrance to Barkley Sound, British Columbia, Canada.

== Today's potential ==
The Ericsson cycle (and the similar Brayton cycle) receives renewed interest today to extract power from the exhaust heat of gas (and producer gas) engines and solar concentrators. An important advantage of the Ericsson cycle over the widely known Stirling engine is often not recognized : the volume of the heat exchanger does not adversely affect the efficiency.

(...)despite having significant advantages over the Stirling. Amongst them, it is worth to note that the Ericsson engine heat exchangers are not dead volumes, whereas the Stirling engine heat exchangers designer has to face a difficult compromise between as large heat transfer areas as possible, but as small heat exchanger volumes as possible.

For medium and large engines the cost of valves can be small compared to this advantage. Turbocompressor plus turbine implementations seem favorable in the MWe range, positive displacement compressor plus turbine for Nx100 kWe power, and positive displacement compressor+expander below 100 kW. With high temperature hydraulic fluid, both the compressor and the expander can be liquid-ring pumps even up to 400 °C, with rotating casing for best efficiency.
