= Quantum heat engine =

Device converting heat flow into usable work at the nanoscale

- Process type: Heat engine

A quantum heat engine generates power from heat flow between hot and cold reservoirs, operating under the principles of quantum mechanics.

== History ==
Scovil and Schulz-DuBois first connected the quantum amplifier to Carnot efficiency in 1959, building a quantum heat engine with a 3-level maser. Geusic, Schulz-DuBois, De Grasse, and Scovil proposed quantum refrigerators, which pump heat from a cold to a hot reservoir using power, in the same year. Wineland and Hänsch suggested laser-driven processes, termed optical pumping or laser cooling. Alicki reported that heat engines and refrigerators can function at the single-particle scale, necessitating quantum thermodynamics.

== 3-level amplifier ==
Three-level amplifier: Levels 1 and 3 couple to the hot reservoir, levels 1 and 2 to the cold reservoir. Power results from population inversion between levels 3 and 2.

A 3-level amplifier uses hot and cold reservoirs to maintain population inversion between two energy levels, amplifying light via stimulated emission. The ground level (1-g) and excited level (3-h) connect to a hot reservoir at temperature $T_\text{h}$, with an energy gap $\hbar \omega_\text{h} = E_3 - E_1$. At equilibrium, the population ratio is:
$$\frac{N_\text{h}}{N_\text{g}} = e^{-\frac{\hbar \omega_\text{h}}{k_\text{B} T_\text{h}}},$$
where $\hbar = \frac{h}{2\pi}$ is the Planck constant, and $k_\text{B}$ is the Boltzmann constant. A cold reservoir at temperature $T_\text{c}$ couples the ground level (1-g) to an intermediate level (2-c), with an energy gap $E_2 - E_1 = \hbar \omega_\text{c}$. At equilibrium:
$$\frac{N_\text{c}}{N_\text{g}} = e^{-\frac{\hbar \omega_\text{c}}{k_\text{B} T_\text{c}}}.$$
The device amplifies when levels 3-h and 2-c couple to an external field of frequency $\nu = \omega_\text{h} - \omega_\text{c}$. Efficiency, defined as the ratio of work output to heat input, is:
$$\eta = \frac{\hbar \nu}{\hbar \omega_\text{h}} = 1 - \frac{\omega_\text{c}}{\omega_\text{h}}.$$
Amplification requires population inversion:
$$G = N_\text{h} - N_\text{c} \ge 0,$$
equivalent to:
$$\frac{\hbar \omega_\text{c}}{k_\text{B} T_\text{c}} \ge \frac{\hbar \omega_\text{h}}{k_\text{B} T_\text{h}}.$$
This leads to an efficiency limit:
$$\eta \le 1 - \frac{T_\text{c}}{T_\text{h}} = \eta_\text{c},$$
where $\eta_\text{c}$ is the Carnot cycle efficiency, achieved at zero gain ($G = 0$). Reversing the process creates a refrigerator, with a coefficient of performance (COP):
$$\epsilon = \frac{\omega_\text{c}}{\nu} \le \frac{T_\text{c}}{T_\text{h} - T_\text{c}}.$$

== Types ==
Quantum devices operate either continuously or via reciprocating cycles. Continuous devices include solar cells, thermoelectric devices (outputting current), and lasers (outputting coherent light). Continuous refrigerators use optical pumping or laser cooling. Reciprocating devices, such as four-stroke or two-stroke machines, mimic classical engines with non-commuting strokes. Common cycles include the Carnot cycle and Otto cycle. The quantum framework allows to obtain from first principles equations of motion for the working medium. The dynamics of the cycle can be solved and a fixed point is sought. The performance characteristics can be calculated for example the power and the and heat flux. The dynamical framework reveals the universal feature of the tradeoff between power and efficiency connecting to Endoreversible thermodynamics.

=== Reciprocating ===
Researchers studied quantum versions of thermodynamic cycles, including the Carnot cycle, Stirling cycle, and Otto cycle. The Otto cycle serves as a model for other reciprocating cycles.

Quantum Otto cycle in the Entropy $\Omega$ plane, showing energy entropy and Von Neumann entropy. $\Omega$ represents the externally controlled internal frequency, mimicking inverse volume in the Otto cycle. Red and blue lines indicate hot and cold isochores. The cycle represents a heat pump.

The Otto cycle consists of four segments:

- Segment $A \rightarrow B$: Isomagnetic or isochoric process, partial equilibration with the cold reservoir, described by propagator $U_\text{c}$.
- Segment $B \rightarrow C$: Magnetization or adiabatic compression, expanding energy level gaps in the Hamiltonian, described by propagator $U_\text{ch}$.
- Segment $C \rightarrow D$: Isomagnetic or isochoric process, partial equilibration with the hot reservoir, described by propagator $U_\text{h}$.
- Segment $D \rightarrow A$: Demagnetization or adiabatic expansion, reducing energy gaps, described by propagator $U_\text{hc}$. The cycle's propagator is:
  $$U_\text{global} = U_\text{hc} U_\text{h} U_\text{ch} U_\text{c}.$$

Propagators are linear operators that define the working medium's state. Consecutive propagators do not commute ($[U_i, U_j] \ne 0$), ensuring non-zero power. The working medium, such as spin systems or harmonic oscillators, requires optimized cycle time. At long cycle times ($\tau_\text{cyc} \gg 2\pi/\omega$), the engine operates quasi-adiabatically, with efficiency $\eta = 1 - \frac{\omega_\text{c}}{\omega_\text{h}}$, below Carnot efficiency. At high temperatures, efficiency at maximum power is $\eta = 1 - \sqrt{\frac{T_\text{c}}{T_\text{h}}}$, matching endoreversible thermodynamics. Short cycle times cause friction-like effects due to non-adiabatic changes, increasing power demands and coherence-induced dissipation. Frictionless solutions exist for finite-time adiabatic expansion/compression. Optimal performance occurs when coherence is minimized. At very short cycle times ($\tau_\text{cyc} \ll 2\pi/\omega$), coherence enhances power. Allahverdyan, Hovhannisyan, and Mahler proposed a two-stroke quantum cycle using two qubits with frequencies $\omega_\text{h}$ and $\omega_\text{c}$. The first stroke partially equilibrates the qubits with hot and cold reservoirs. The second stroke swaps qubit states, preserving entropy and generating power. Quantum Otto cycle refrigerators align with magnetic refrigeration.

A Quantum Carnot cycle replaces the isochoric process with isothermal process. As a result the working medium changes its hamiltonian while coupled to the thermal reservoir and there is no separation between heat and work. Nevertheless a qubit Carnot cycle as a working medium has been analyzed, demonstrating the quantum origin of the tradeoff between power and efficiency.

=== Continuous ===
Continuous engines, analogous to turbines, couple to an external periodic field, typically the electromagnetic field, modeling a laser. Models vary by working medium and heat reservoirs. Studied systems include two-level, three-level, four-level, and coupled harmonic oscillators. Periodic driving splits the energy levels, enabling selective coupling to reservoirs and power production. Ignoring this splitting in equations of motion violates the second law of thermodynamics. Scully proposed non-thermal fuels, such as coherence or squeezed thermal baths, to increase the hot reservoir's energy without raising entropy, complying with the second law.

== Equivalence of heat machines ==
Uzdin, Levy, and Kosloff reported that two-stroke, four-stroke, and continuous quantum engines become thermodynamically equivalent in a quantum regime, producing identical work and heat with the same efficiency, driven by coherent work extraction without a classical analogue. Reciprocating devices have been suggested operating by either the Carnot cycle or the Otto cycle.

In both types the quantum description allows to obtain equation of motion for the working medium and the heat flux. When the cycle is completed they all turn out to provide the same amount of work and consume the same amount of heat (hence they share the same efficiency as well). This equivalence is associated with a coherent work extraction mechanism and has no classical analogue. These quantum features have been demonstrated experimentally.

== Open quantum systems ==
Elementary quantum heat engines operate near equilibrium, with discrete energy levels as their primary quantum feature. Realistic devices, operating out of equilibrium, experience friction, heat leaks, and finite heat flow. Quantum thermodynamics provides a dynamical framework for such systems. Open quantum system theory describes the working medium's dynamics, tracing out the reservoirs. The total Hamiltonian is:
$$H = H_\text{s} + H_\text{c} + H_\text{h} + H_\text{sc} + H_\text{sh},$$
where $H_\text{s}(t)$ is time-dependent. The reduced equation of motion is:
$$\frac{d}{dt} \rho = -\frac{i}{\hbar}[H_\text{s},\rho] + L_\text{h}(\rho) + L_\text{c}(\rho),$$
where $\rho$ is the density operator, and $L_\text{h/c}$ represents dissipative dynamics. Energy change is:
$$\frac{d}{dt} E = \left\langle \frac{\partial H_\text{s}}{\partial t} \right\rangle + \langle L_\text{h}(H_\text{s}) \rangle + \langle L_\text{c}(H_\text{s}) \rangle,$$
yielding the dynamical first law of thermodynamics: * Power: $P = \left\langle \frac{\partial H}{\partial t} \right\rangle$ * Heat currents: $J_\text{h} = \langle L_\text{h}(H_\text{s}) \rangle$, $J_\text{c} = \langle L_\text{c}(H_\text{s}) \rangle$. Entropy production rate is:
$$\frac{d S}{dt} = -\frac{J_\text{h}}{T_\text{h}} - \frac{J_\text{c}}{T_\text{c}} \ge 0.$$
A thermodynamically consistent derivation uses the weak coupling limit, assuming uncorrelated system and reservoirs:
$$\rho = \rho_\text{s} \otimes \rho_\text{h} \otimes \rho_\text{c}.$$
The equation of motion becomes:
$$\frac{d}{dt} \rho_\text{s} = L \rho_\text{s},$$
where $L$ is the Liouville superoperator, often in the Gorini-Kossakowski-Sudarshan-Lindblad form. Strong coupling theories also exist.

== Refrigerators ==
=== Absorption ===
The absorption refrigerator, an autonomous quantum device, requires no external power or intervention. It uses three reservoirs: power ($T_\text{d}$), hot ($T_\text{h}$), and cold ($T_\text{c}$).

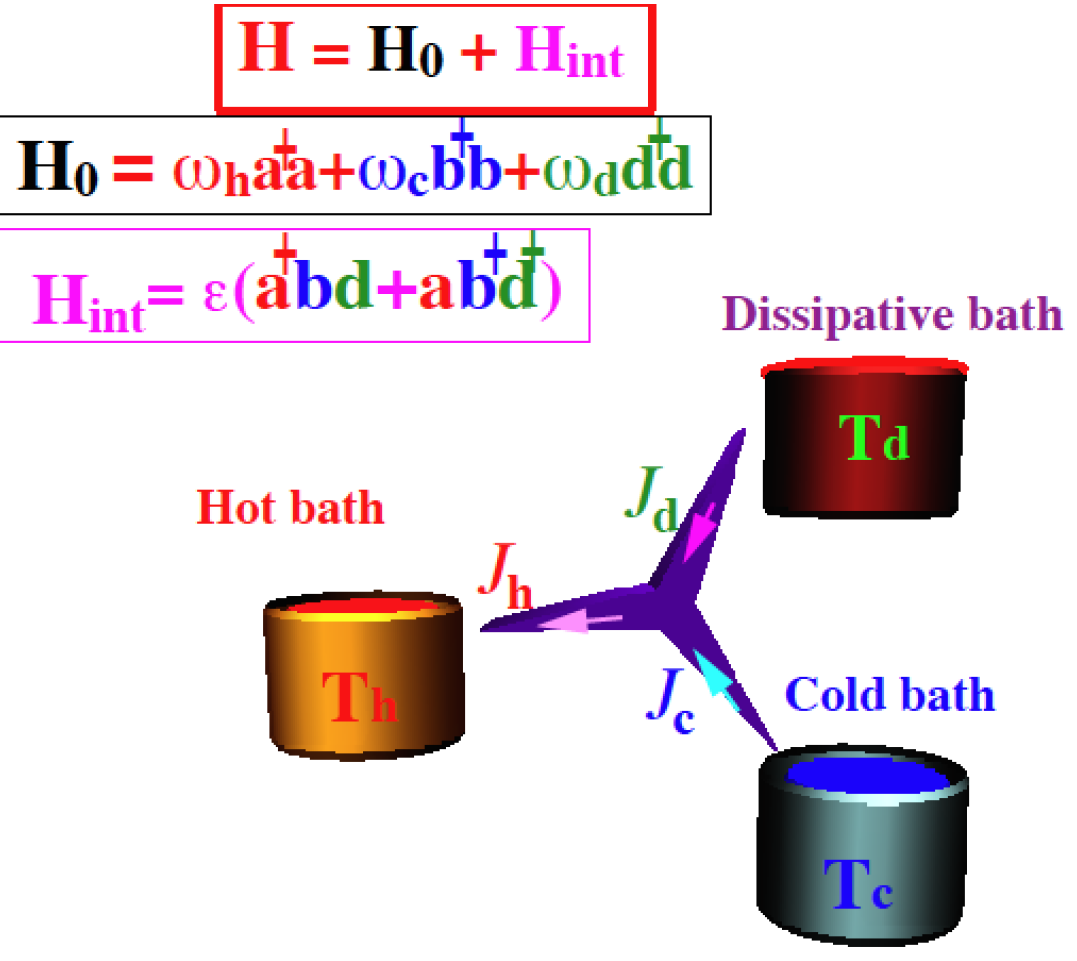
Quantum tricycle absorption refrigerator with three reservoirs ($T_\text{d} \ge T_\text{h} \ge T_\text{c}$). Heat flows from the power and cold reservoirs to the hot reservoir.

The tricycle model uses three oscillators:
$$H_0 = \hbar \omega_\text{h} a^{\dagger} a + \hbar \omega_\text{c} b^{\dagger} b + \hbar \omega_\text{d} c^{\dagger} c,$$
with resonance condition $\omega_\text{d} = \omega_\text{h} - \omega_\text{c}$. The refrigerator removes excitations from the cold and power reservoirs, generating an excitation in the hot reservoir. The interaction Hamiltonian is:
$$H_I = \hbar \epsilon (a b^{\dagger} c^{\dagger} + a^{\dagger} b c),$$
where $\epsilon$ is the coupling strength. Energy balance follows the first law of thermodynamics:
$$\frac{dE_\text{s}}{dt} = J_\text{h} + J_\text{c} + J_\text{d}.$$
At steady state, $\frac{dE_\text{s}}{dt} = 0$. Entropy production, per the second law of thermodynamics, is:
$$\frac{d}{dt} \Delta S_\text{u} = -\frac{J_\text{h}}{T_\text{h}} - \frac{J_\text{c}}{T_\text{c}} - \frac{J_\text{d}}{T_\text{d}} \ge 0.$$
When $T_\text{d} \rightarrow \infty$, the power reservoir produces no entropy, yielding pure power: $P = J_\text{d}$. Aamir and others implemented this in a superconducting circuit to reset a Qubit.

=== Quantum analysis of the third law of thermodynamics. ===
Nernst proposed two formulations of the third law of thermodynamics. The Nernst heat theorem states that a pure substance's entropy approaches zero as temperature nears absolute zero. The unattainability principle states that no procedure can cool a system to absolute zero in finite operations. At steady state, the second law of thermodynamics requires non-negative entropy production. As the cold reservoir approaches absolute zero, entropy production must scale as:
$$\dot S_\text{c} \propto - T_\text{c}^{\alpha}, \alpha \geq 0.$$
The third law strengthens this to $\alpha > 0$, ensuring zero entropy production at absolute zero ($\dot S_\text{c} = 0$), with heat current scaling as $J_\text{c} \propto T_\text{c}^{\alpha+1}$. The unattainability principle, rephrased by Levy, Alicki, and Kosloff, states that no refrigerator can reach absolute zero in finite time. Cooling dynamics follow:
$$J_\text{c}(T_\text{c}(t)) = -c_V(T_\text{c}(t)) \frac{dT_\text{c}(t)}{dt},$$

where $c_V(T_\text{c})$ is the reservoir's heat capacity. With $J_\text{c} \propto T_\text{c}^{\alpha+1}$ and $c_V \sim T_\text{c}^{\eta}$ ($\eta \geq 0$), the cooling exponent is:
$$\frac{dT_\text{c}(t)}{dt} \propto -T_\text{c}^{\zeta}, \zeta = \alpha - \eta + 1.$$
If $\zeta < 0$, cooling to absolute zero in finite time violates the third law, making the unattainability principle more restrictive than the Nernst heat theorem.
