= Carnot's theorem (thermodynamics) =

Maximum attainable efficiency of any heat engine

Carnot's theorem (English: /kɑːrˈnoʊ/ kar-NOH, French: [kaʁno]), also called Carnot's rule or Carnot's law, is a principle of thermodynamics developed by Nicolas Léonard Sadi Carnot in 1824 that specifies limits on the maximum efficiency that any heat engine can obtain.

Carnot's theorem states that all heat engines operating between the same two thermal or heat reservoirs cannot have efficiencies greater than a reversible heat engine operating between the same reservoirs. A corollary of this theorem is that every reversible heat engine operating between a pair of heat reservoirs is equally efficient, regardless of the working substance employed or the operation details. Since a Carnot heat engine is also a reversible engine, the efficiency of all the reversible heat engines is determined as the efficiency of the Carnot heat engine that depends solely on the temperatures of its hot and cold reservoirs.

The maximum efficiency (i.e., the Carnot heat engine efficiency) of a heat engine operating between hot and cold reservoirs, denoted as H and C respectively, is the ratio of the temperature difference between the reservoirs to the hot reservoir temperature, expressed in the equation

$$\eta_{\text{max}} = \frac{T_\mathrm{H}-T_\mathrm{C}}{T_\mathrm{H}},$$

where $T_\mathrm{H}$ and $T_\mathrm{C}$ are the absolute temperatures of the hot and cold reservoirs, respectively, and the efficiency $\eta$ is the ratio of the work done by the engine (to the surroundings) to the heat drawn out of the hot reservoir (to the engine).

$\eta_\text{max}$ is greater than zero if and only if there is a temperature difference between the two thermal reservoirs. Since $\eta_\text{max}$ is the upper limit of all reversible and irreversible heat engine efficiencies, it is concluded that work from a heat engine can be produced if and only if there is a temperature difference between two thermal reservoirs connecting to the engine.

Carnot's theorem is a consequence of the second law of thermodynamics. Historically, it was based on contemporary caloric theory, and preceded the establishment of the second law.

== Proof ==
An impossible situation: A heat engine cannot drive a less-efficient reversible heat engine without violating the second law of thermodynamics. Quantities in this figure are the absolute values of energy transfers (heat and work).

The proof of the Carnot theorem is a proof by contradiction, based on a situation like the right figure where two heat engines with different efficiencies are operating between two thermal reservoirs at different temperature. The relatively hotter reservoir is called the hot reservoir and the other reservoir is called the cold reservoir. A (not necessarily reversible) heat engine $M$ with a greater efficiency $\eta_{_M}$ is driving a reversible heat engine $L$ with a less efficiency $\eta_{_L}$, causing the latter to act as a heat pump. The requirement for the engine $L$ to be reversible is necessary to explain work $W$ and heat $Q$ associated with it by using its known efficiency. However, since $\eta_{_M}>\eta_{_L}$, the net heat flow would be backwards, i.e., into the hot reservoir:

$$Q^\text{out}_\text{h} = Q < \frac{\eta_{_M}}{\eta_{_L}}Q=Q^\text{in}_\text{h},$$

where $Q$ represents heat, $\text{in}$ denotes input to an object, $\text{out}$ for output from an object, and $h$ for the hot thermal reservoir. If heat $Q^\text{out}_\text{h}$ flows from the hot reservoir then it has the sign of + while if $Q^\text{in}_\text{h}$ flows from the hot reservoir then it has the sign of -. This expression can be easily derived by using the definition of the efficiency of a heat engine, $\eta=W/Q_\text{h}^\text{in}$, where work and heat in this expression are net quantities per engine cycle, and the conservation of energy for each engine as shown below. The sign convention of work $W$, with which the sign of + for work done by an engine to its surroundings, is employed.

The above expression means that heat into the hot reservoir from the engine pair (can be considered as a single engine) is greater than heat into the engine pair from the hot reservoir (i.e., the hot reservoir continuously gets energy). A reversible heat engine with a low efficiency delivers more heat (energy) to the hot reservoir for a given amount of work (energy) to this engine when it is being driven as a heat pump. All these mean that heat can transfer from cold to hot places without external work, and such a heat transfer is impossible by the second law of thermodynamics.

- It may seem odd that a hypothetical reversible heat pump with a low efficiency is used to violate the second law of thermodynamics, but the figure of merit for refrigerator units is not the efficiency, $W/Q_\text{h}^\text{out}$, but the coefficient of performance (COP), which is $Q_\text{c}^\text{out}/W$ where this $W$ has the sign opposite to the above (+ for work done to the engine).

Let's find the values of work $W$and heat $Q$ depicted in the right figure in which a reversible heat engine $L$ with a less efficiency $\eta_{_L}$ is driven as a heat pump by a heat engine $M$ with a more efficiency $\eta_{_M}$.

The definition of the efficiency is $\eta = W/Q_\text{h}^\text{out}$ for each engine and the following expressions can be made:

$$\eta_M= \frac{W_M}{Q^{\text{out},M}_\text{h}} = \frac{\eta_M Q}{Q}=\eta_M,$$

$$\eta_L = \frac{W_L}{Q^{\text{out},L}_\text{h}} = \frac{-\eta_M Q}{-\frac{\eta_M}{\eta_L}Q} = \eta_L.$$

The denominator of the second expression, $Q^{\text{out},L}_\text{h} = -\frac{\eta_M}{\eta_L}Q$, is made to make the expression to be consistent, and it helps to fill the values of work and heat for the engine $L$.

For each engine, the absolute value of the energy entering the engine, $E_\text{abs}^\text{in}$, must be equal to the absolute value of the energy leaving from the engine, $E_\text{abs}^\text{out}$. Otherwise, energy is continuously accumulated in an engine or the conservation of energy is violated by taking more energy from an engine than input energy to the engine:

$$E_\text{M,abs}^\text{in} = Q = (1-\eta_M)Q + \eta_M Q = E_\text{M,abs}^\text{out},$$

$$E_\text{L,abs}^\text{in} = \eta_M Q + \eta_M Q \left(\frac{1}{\eta_L}- 1 \right ) = \frac{\eta_M}{\eta_L}Q = E_\text{L,abs}^\text{out}.$$

In the second expression, $\left| Q^{\text{out},L}_\text{h} \right| = \left| - \frac{\eta_M}{\eta_L}Q \right|$ is used to find the term $\eta_M Q \left(\frac{1}{\eta_L}- 1 \right )$ describing the amount of heat taken from the cold reservoir, completing the absolute value expressions of work and heat in the right figure.

Having established that the right figure values are correct, Carnot's theorem may be proven for irreversible and the reversible heat engines as shown below.

=== Reversible engines ===
To see that every reversible engine operating between reservoirs at temperatures $T_1$ and $T_2$ must have the same efficiency, assume that two reversible heat engines have different efficiencies, and let the relatively more efficient engine $M$ drive the relatively less efficient engine $L$ as a heat pump. As the right figure shows, this will cause heat to flow from the cold to the hot reservoir without external work, which violates the second law of thermodynamics. Therefore, both (reversible) heat engines have the same efficiency, and we conclude that:

All reversible heat engines that operate between the same two thermal (heat) reservoirs have the same efficiency.

The reversible heat engine efficiency can be determined by analyzing a Carnot heat engine as one of reversible heat engine.

This conclusion is an important result because it helps establish the Clausius theorem, which implies that the change in entropy $S$ is unique for all reversible processes:

$$\Delta S = \int_a^b \frac {dQ_\text{rev}}T$$

as the entropy change, that is made during a transition from a thermodynamic equilibrium state $a$ to a state $b$ in a V-T (Volume-Temperature) space, is the same over all reversible process paths between these two states. If this integral were not path independent, then entropy would not be a state variable.

=== Irreversible engines ===
Consider two engines, $M$ and $L$, which are irreversible and reversible respectively. We construct the machine shown in the right figure, with $M$ driving $L$ as a heat pump. Then if $M$ is more efficient than $L$, the machine will violate the second law of thermodynamics. Since a Carnot heat engine is a reversible heat engine, and all reversible heat engines operate with the same efficiency between the same reservoirs, we have the first part of Carnot's theorem:

No irreversible heat engine is more efficient than a Carnot heat engine operating between the same two thermal reservoirs.

== Definition of thermodynamic temperature ==
The efficiency of a heat engine is the work done by the engine divided by the heat introduced to the engine per engine cycle or

$\eta = \frac {w_\text{cy}}{q_H} = \frac{q_H-q_C}{q_H} = 1 - \frac{q_C}{q_H}$	1

where $w_\text{cy}$ is the work done by the engine, $q_C$ is the heat to the cold reservoir from the engine, and $q_H$ is the heat to the engine from the hot reservoir, per cycle. Thus, the efficiency depends only on $\frac{q_C}{q_H}$.

Because all reversible heat engines operating between temperatures $T_1$ and $T_2$ must have the same efficiency, the efficiency of a reversible heat engine is a function of only the two reservoir temperatures:

$\frac{q_C}{q_H} = f(T_H,T_C)$.	2

In addition, a reversible heat engine operating between temperatures $T_1$ and $T_3$ must have the same efficiency as one consisting of two cycles, one between $T_1$ and another (intermediate) temperature $T_2$, and the second between $T_2$ and $T_3$ ($T_1 < T_2 < T_3$). This can only be the case if

$f(T_1,T_3) = \frac{q_3}{q_1} = \frac{q_2 q_3} {q_1 q_2} = f(T_1,T_2)f(T_2,T_3)$.	3

Specializing to the case that $T_1$ is a fixed reference temperature: the temperature of the triple point of water as 273.16. (Of course any reference temperature and any positive numerical value could be used — the choice here corresponds to the Kelvin scale.) Then for any $T_2$ and $T_3$,

$$f(T_2,T_3) = \frac{f(T_1,T_3)}{f(T_1,T_2)} = \frac{273.16 \cdot f(T_1,T_3)}{273.16 \cdot f(T_1,T_2)}.$$

Therefore, if thermodynamic temperature is defined by

$$T' = 273.16 \cdot f(T_1,T),$$

then the function viewed as a function of thermodynamic temperature, is

$$f(T_2,T_3) = \frac{T_3'}{T_2'}.$$

It follows immediately that

$\frac{q_C}{q_H} = f(T_H,T_C) = \frac{T_C'}{T_H'}$.	4

Substituting this equation back into the above equation $\frac{q_C}{q_H} = f(T_H,T_C)$ gives a relationship for the efficiency in terms of thermodynamic temperatures:

$\eta = 1 - \frac{q_C}{q_H} = 1 - \frac{T_C'}{T_H'}$.	5

== Applicability to electrical systems ==
Since fuel cells can generate useful power when all components of the system are at the same temperature ($T=T_H=T_C$), they are clearly not limited by Carnot's theorem, which states that no power can be generated when $T_H=T_C$. This is because Carnot's theorem applies to engines converting thermal energy to work, whereas fuel cells instead convert chemical energy to work. Nevertheless, the second law of thermodynamics still provides restrictions on fuel cell energy conversion.

A Carnot battery is a type of energy storage system that stores electricity in thermal energy storage and converts the stored heat back to electricity through thermodynamic cycles.

== See also ==
- Chambadal–Novikov efficiency
- Heating and cooling efficiency bounds
