= Johnson thermoelectric energy converter =

Type of solid-state thermo-electrochemical heat engine

The Johnson thermoelectric energy converter (JTEC), also known as the Johnson thermo-electrochemical converter, is a solid-state heat engine that utilizes the electrochemical oxidation and reduction of hydrogen within a two-cell thermal cycle to approximate the thermodynamic Ericsson cycle. Invented by American engineer Lonnie Johnson, the device is under investigation as a high-efficiency alternative to conventional thermoelectric generators and mechanical heat engines.

Johnson has stated that the converter has the theoretical potential to achieve an energy conversion efficiency of up to 60% of the Carnot limit; however, this performance level assumes an extreme operating temperature gradient of approximately 600 °C (1,112 °F).

Early development proposals were submitted to the Office of Naval Research but were initially declined. Johnson subsequently secured funding by reframing the underlying technology around its hydrogen fuel cell mechanics, leading to collaborative development efforts with PARC (Palo Alto Research Center).

== Mechanism of action ==
The JTEC operates as a closed-loop, solid-state heat engine that converts thermal energy directly into electrical energy through the continuous electrochemical compression and expansion of hydrogen gas. Because it utilizes no moving mechanical parts (such as turbines, pistons, or pumps), it operates silently, requires no consumable fuel inputs during operation, and generates no chemical exhaust.

The thermodynamic cycle approximates the Ericsson cycle—consisting of two isothermal processes (expansion and compression) paired with two isobaric heat-exchange processes. The system comprises two primary electrochemical stages coupled by a heat exchanger:

- High-Temperature Power Stage (Expansion): Heat from an external source is applied to the working fluid chamber. High-pressure hydrogen gas enters this chamber, which is bisected by a proprietary membrane electrode assembly (MEA) containing a specialized ceramic proton exchange membrane (PEM) sandwiched between two electrodes. As the gas expands through the MEA, hydrogen molecules are ionized at the anode into protons and electrons. The protons migrate directly through the ceramic membrane, while the electrodes force the separated electrons to flow through an external circuit, generating electrical power. At the cathode, the protons and electrons recombine into low-pressure hydrogen gas.
- Low-Temperature Compression Stage: The low-pressure hydrogen gas exits the power stage and enters the low-temperature chamber. Here, a portion of the electrical power generated by the high-temperature stage is applied across a second MEA to electrochemically compress the gas back into high-pressure hydrogen, rejecting waste heat to an ambient heat sink.

The net electrical energy delivered to the external load is the differential between the large amount of electrical power generated during high-temperature expansion and the smaller amount of electrical work required to compress the gas at a lower temperature. As hydrogen circulates between the two stages, it passes through a counter-flow heat exchanger (regenerator), which preheats the gas entering the power stage and cools the gas entering the compression stage, significantly improving overall thermal efficiency.

The JTEC shares operational similarities with the alkali-metal thermal to electric converter (AMTEC). However, by utilizing hydrogen as the working fluid rather than highly reactive molten alkali metals (such as sodium or potassium), the JTEC avoids severe material corrosion and simplifies fluid management. Because the cycle relies on active electrochemical compression, an initial electrical pulse is required to initiate circulation when starting from a cold state. Additionally, by reversing the electric current, the JTEC can operate in reverse as a solid-state heat pump or refrigerator for HVAC applications.

== Applications ==
Because the JTEC functions as an external combustion engine, it is agnostic to the primary heat source. It can generate electrical power from a diverse array of thermal inputs without requiring specialized fuel customization, including:

- Solar Thermal: Concentrated solar irradiance heating the high-temperature stage while ambient air or water cools the compression stage.
- Industrial Waste Heat Recovery: Capturing low- to medium-grade waste heat from manufacturing processes, turbines, or internal combustion engines to improve overall plant efficiency.
- Space and Nuclear Power: High-reliability power conversion for radioisotope or nuclear thermal sources in deep-space missions, where the absence of moving parts reduces mechanical failure rates.
- Micro-Scale Power: Scaling down for microelectromechanical systems (MEMS) or remote sensor installations where maintenance-free operation is required.

== See also ==
- Alkali-metal thermal to electric converter
- Electrochemically compressed hydrogen
- Thermoelectric generator
