= Stirling cycle =

Thermodynamic cycle that includes the basic Stirling engine

The Stirling cycle is a thermodynamic cycle that describes the general class of Stirling devices. This includes the original Stirling engine that was invented, developed and patented in 1816 by Robert Stirling with help from his brother, an engineer.

The ideal Otto and Diesel cycles are not totally reversible because they involve heat transfer through a finite temperature difference during the irreversible isochoric/isobaric heat-addition and heat-rejection processes. The irreversibility renders the thermal efficiency of these cycles less than that of a Carnot engine operating within the same limits of temperature. Another cycle that features isothermal heat-addition and heat-rejection processes is the Stirling cycle, which is an altered version of the Carnot cycle in which the two isentropic processes featured in the Carnot cycle are replaced by two constant-volume regeneration processes.

The cycle is reversible, meaning that if supplied with mechanical power, it can function as a heat pump for heating or cooling, and even for cryogenic cooling. The cycle is defined as a closed regenerative cycle with a gaseous working fluid. "Closed cycle" means the working fluid is permanently contained within the thermodynamic system. This also categorizes the engine device as an external heat engine. "Regenerative" refers to the use of an internal heat exchanger called a regenerator which increases the device's thermal efficiency.

The cycle is the same as most other heat cycles in that there are four main processes: compression, heat addition, expansion, and heat removal. However, these processes are not discrete, but rather the transitions overlap.

The Stirling cycle is a highly advanced subject that has defied analysis by many experts for over 190 years. Highly advanced thermodynamics is required to describe the cycle. Professor Israel Urieli writes: "...the various 'ideal' cycles (such as the Schmidt cycle) are neither physically realizable nor representative of the Stirling cycle".

The analytical problem of the regenerator (the central heat exchanger in the Stirling cycle) is judged by Jakob to rank "among the most difficult and involved that are encountered in engineering".

== Idealized Stirling cycle thermodynamics ==
A pressure/volume graph of the idealized Stirling cycle. In real applications of the Stirling cycles (e.g. Stirling engines) this cycle is quasi-elliptical.

The idealized Stirling cycle consists of four thermodynamic processes acting on the working fluid (See diagram to right):

1. 1→2 Isothermal heat addition (expansion).
2. 2→3 Isochoric heat removal (constant volume).
3. 3→4 Isothermal heat removal (compression).
4. 4→1 Isochoric heat addition (constant volume).

== Piston motion variations ==
A model of a four-phase Stirling cycle

Most thermodynamics textbooks describe a highly simplified form of Stirling cycle consisting of four processes. This is known as an "ideal Stirling cycle", because it is an "idealized" model, and not necessarily an optimized cycle. Theoretically, the "ideal cycle" does have high net work output, but it is rarely used in practical applications, in part because other cycles are simpler or reduce peak stresses on bearings and other components. For convenience, the designer may elect to use piston motions dictated by system dynamics, such as mechanical linkage mechanisms. At any rate, the efficiency and cycle power are nearly as good as an actual implementation of the idealized case. A typical piston crank or linkage in a so named "kinematic" design often results in a near-sinusoidal piston motion. Some designs will cause the piston to "dwell" at either extreme of travel.

Many kinematic linkages, such as the well known "Ross yoke", will exhibit near-sinusoidal motion. However, other linkages, such as the "rhombic drive", will exhibit more non-sinusoidal motion. To a lesser extent, the ideal cycle introduces complications, since it would require somewhat higher piston acceleration and higher viscous pumping losses of the working fluid. The material stresses and pumping losses in an optimized engine, however, would only be intolerable when approaching the "ideal cycle" and/or at high cycle rates. Other issues include the time required for heat transfer, particularly for the isothermal processes. In an engine with a cycle approaching the "ideal cycle", the cycle rate might have to be reduced to address these issues.

In the most basic model of a free piston device, the kinematics will result in simple harmonic motion.

== Volume variations ==
In beta and gamma engines, generally the phase angle difference between the piston motions is not the same as the phase angle of the volume variations. However, in the alpha Stirling, they are the same. The rest of the article assumes sinusoidal volume variations, as in an alpha Stirling with co-linear pistons, so named an "opposed piston" alpha device.

caveat: Among the many inaccuracies in this article, a co-linear alpha configuration is referenced, above. Such a configuration would be beta. Alternatively, it would be an alpha, that has an unacceptably inefficient linkage system.

== Pressure-versus-volume graph ==
This type of plot is used to characterize almost all thermodynamic cycles. The result of sinusoidal volume variations is the quasi-elliptical shaped cycle shown in Figure 1. Compared to the idealized cycle, this cycle is a more realistic representation of most real Stirling engines. The four points in the graph indicate the crank angle in degrees.

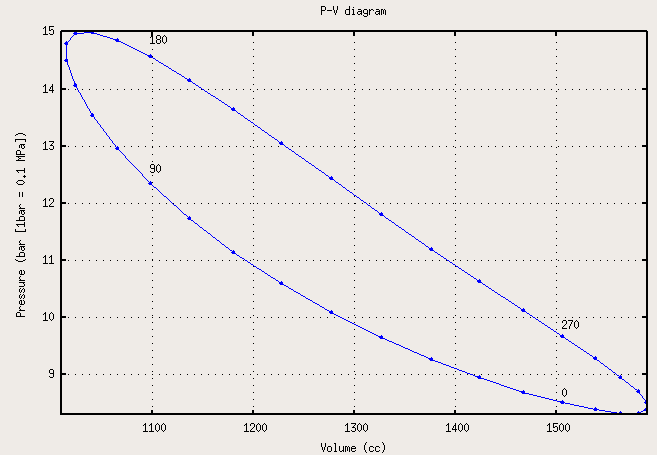

The adiabatic Stirling cycle is similar to the idealized Stirling cycle; however, the four thermodynamic processes are slightly different (see graph above):

- 180° to 270°, pseudo-isothermal expansion. The expansion space is heated externally, and the gas undergoes near-isothermal expansion.
- 270° to 0°, near-constant-volume (or near-isometric or isochoric) heat removal. The gas is passed through the regenerator, thus cooling the gas, and transferring heat to the regenerator for use in the next cycle.
- 0° to 90°, pseudo-isothermal compression. The compression space is intercooled, so the gas undergoes near-isothermal compression.
- 90° to 180°, near-constant-volume (near-isometric or isochoric) heat addition. The compressed air flows back through the regenerator and picks up heat on the way to the heated expansion space.

With the exception of a Stirling thermoacoustic engine, none of the gas particles actually flow through the complete cycle. So this approach is not amenable to further analysis of the cycle. However, it provides an overview and indicates the cycle work.

== Particle/mass motion ==
Figure 2 shows the streaklines which indicate how gas flows through a real Stirling engine. The vertical colored lines delineate the volumes of the engine. From left to right, they are: the volume swept by the expansion (power) piston, the clearance volume (which prevents the piston from contacting the hot heat exchanger), the heater, the regenerator, the cooler, the cooler clearance volume, and the compression volume swept by the compression piston.

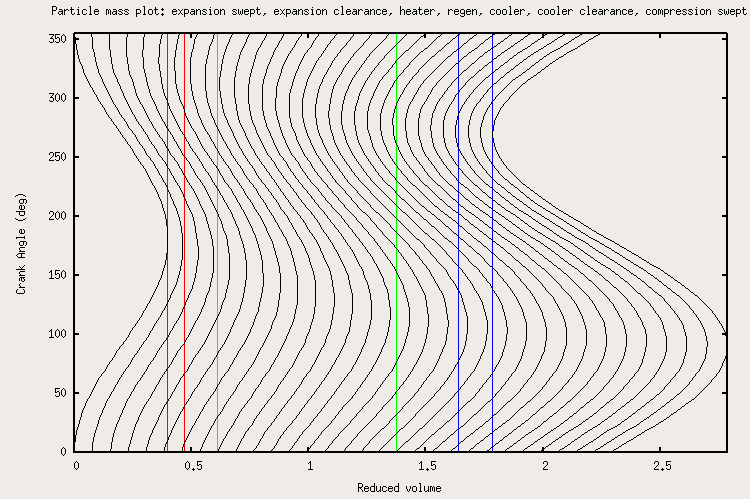

Alpha type Stirling. Animated version.

== Heat-exchanger pressure drop ==
Also referred to as "pumping losses", the pressure drops shown in Figure 3 are caused by viscous flow through the heat exchangers. The red line represents the heater, green is the regenerator, and blue is the cooler. To properly design the heat exchangers, multivariate optimization is required to obtain sufficient heat transfer with acceptable flow losses. The flow losses shown here are relatively low, and they are barely visible in the following image, which will show the overall pressure variations in the cycle.

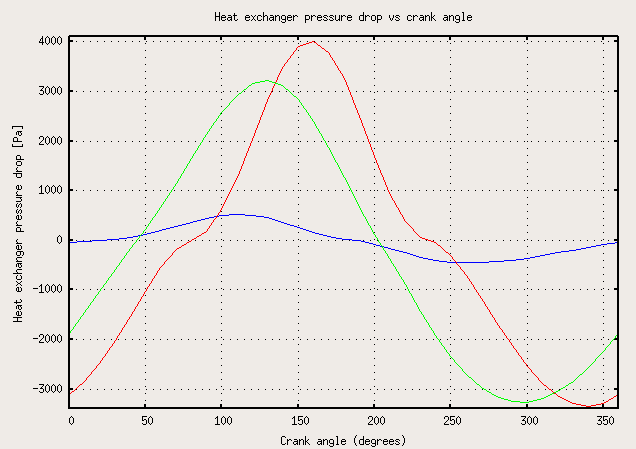

== Pressure versus crank angle ==
Figure 4 shows results from an "adiabatic simulation" with non-ideal heat exchangers. Note that the pressure drop across the regenerator is very low compared to the overall pressure variation in the cycle.

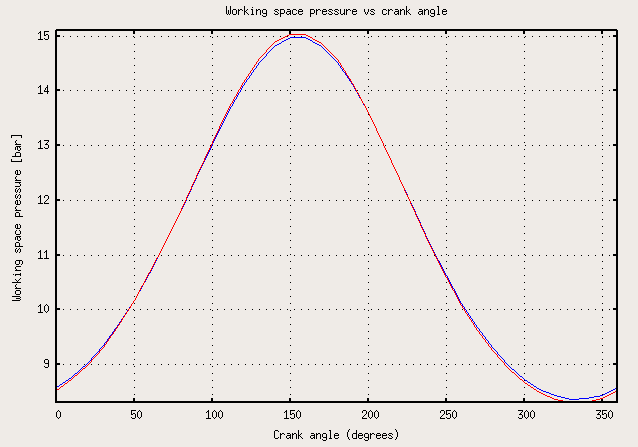

== Temperature versus crank angle ==
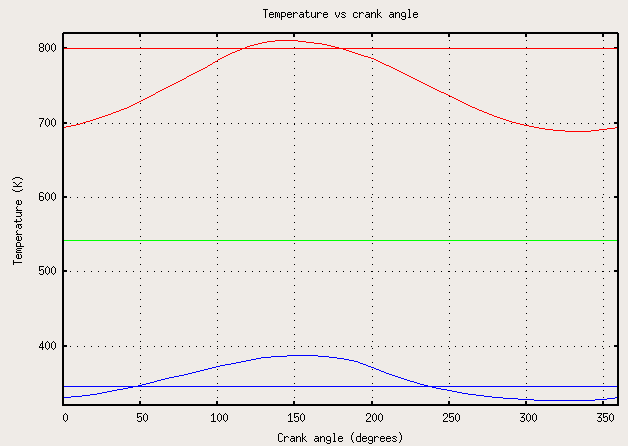

Figure 5 illustrates the adiabatic properties of a real heat exchanger. The straight lines represent the temperatures of the solid portion of the heat exchanger, and the curves are the gas temperatures of the respective spaces. The gas temperature fluctuations are caused by the effects of compression and expansion in the engine, together with non-ideal heat exchangers which have a limited rate of heat transfer. When the gas temperature deviates above and below the heat exchanger temperature, it causes thermodynamic losses known as "heat transfer losses" or "hysteresis losses". However, the heat exchangers still work well enough to allow the real cycle to be effective, even if the actual thermal efficiency of the overall system is only about half of the theoretical limit.

== Cumulative heat and work energy ==
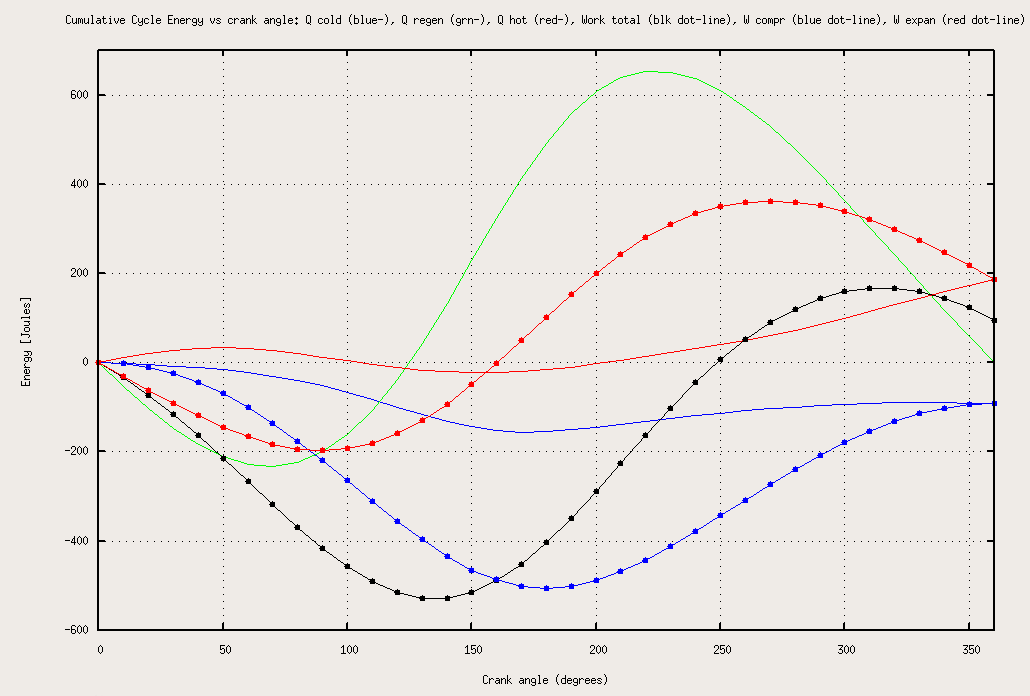

Figure 6 shows a graph of the alpha-type Stirling engine data, where 'Q' denotes heat energy, and 'W' denotes work energy. The blue dotted line shows the work output of the compression space. As the trace dips down, work is done on the gas as it is compressed. During the expansion process of the cycle, some work is actually done on the compression piston, as reflected by the upward movement of the trace. At the end of the cycle, this value is negative, indicating that compression piston requires a net input of work. The blue solid line shows the heat flowing out of the cooler heat exchanger. The heat from the cooler and the work from the compression piston have the same cycle energy. This is consistent with the zero-net heat transfer of the regenerator (solid green line). As would be expected, the heater and the expansion space both have positive energy flow. The black dotted line shows the net work output of the cycle. On this trace, the cycle ends higher than it started, indicating that the heat engine converts energy from heat into work.

== See also ==
- Pseudo Stirling cycle
- Stirling engine
- Solar-powered Stirling engine
- Stirling radioisotope generator
