= Work output =

In physics, work output is the work done by a simple machine, compound machine, or any type of engine model. In common terms, it is the energy output, which for simple machines is always less than the energy input, even though the forces may be drastically different.

In [thermodynamics], work output can refer to the thermodynamic work done by a heat engine, in which case the amount of work output must be less than the input as energy is lost to heat, as determined by the engine's efficiency.
