= Malone engine =

Hot water engine

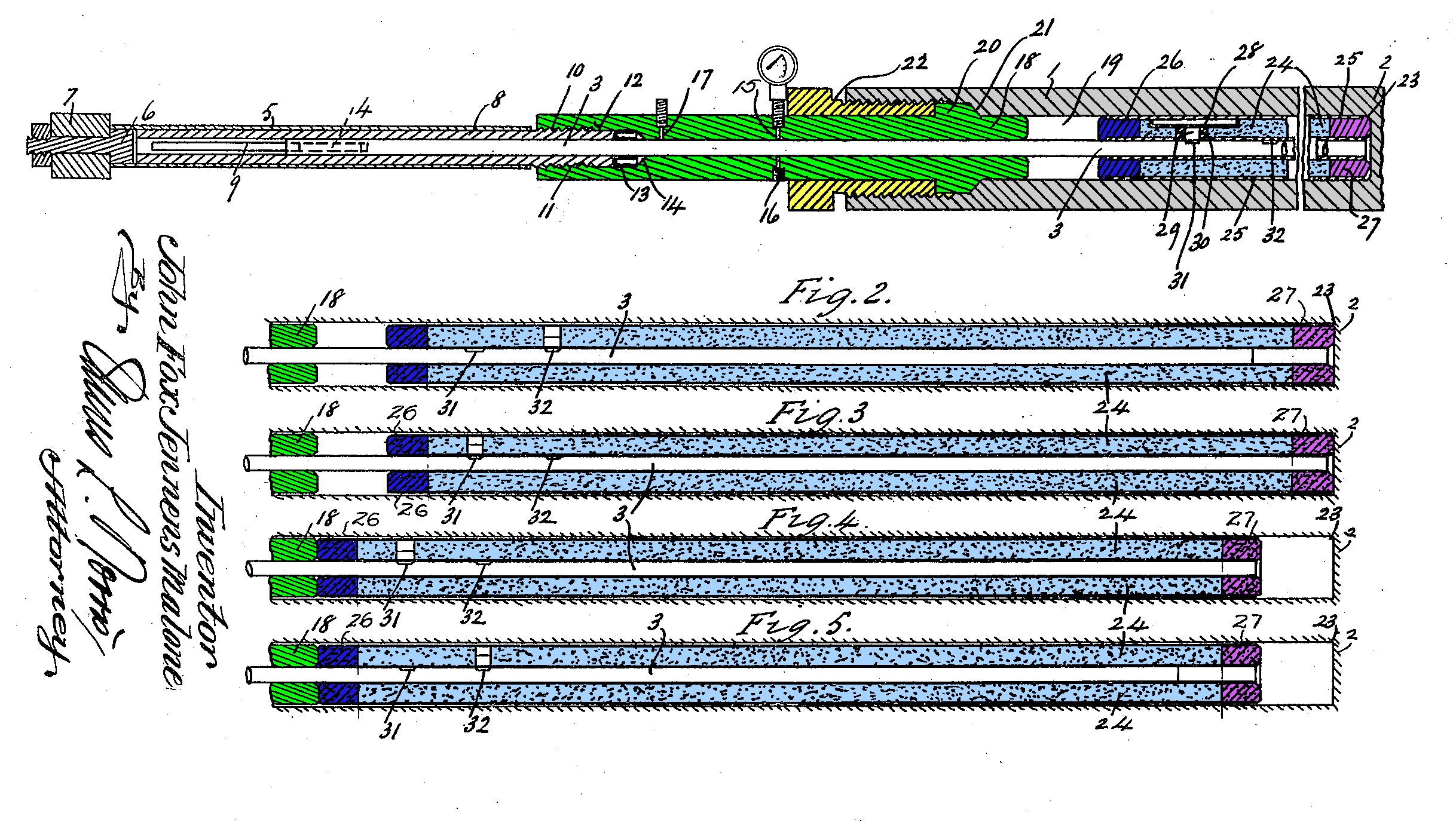
Patent drawing

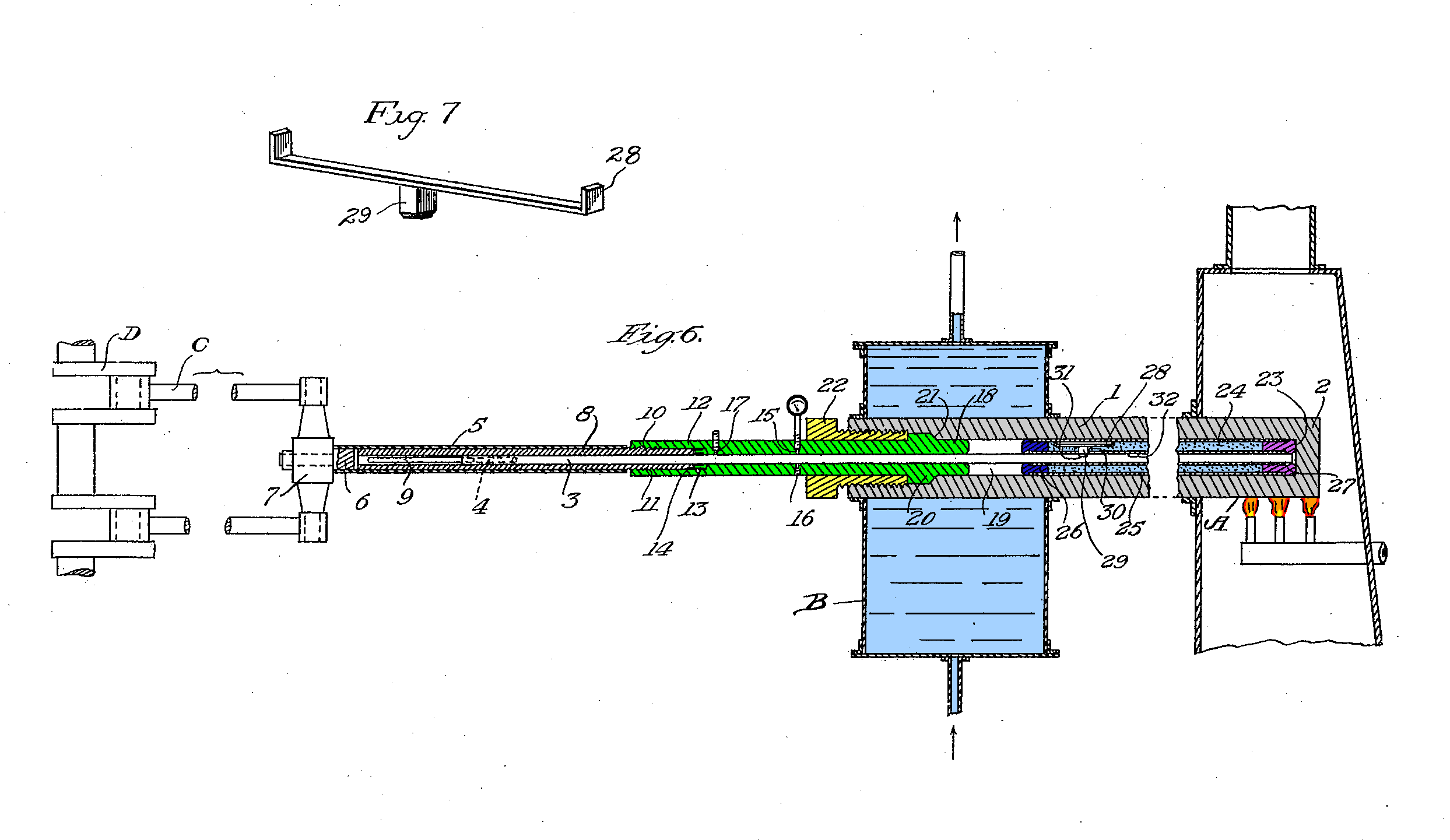
Patent drawing

The Malone engine is a liquid-based engine invented by J.F.J Malone of Newcastle, England. The engine used high temperature water as its working fluid, and was therefore also referred to as the Hot Water Engine. A US patent, describing it with Mercury or a Mercury-Lead Alloy as working fluid, for the engine was granted in 1924, Malone's first 50 hp prototype was completed in 1925, and used coal to heat high pressure water sealed inside a cylinder. Malone's second prototype, demonstrated in 1931, also produced 50 hp but in a much smaller design.

In independent testing the design showed an efficiency of 27%, which exceeded the efficiency of steam engines of the day and approximately equalled the efficiency of a gasoline engine.

The cycle used by the Malone engine is a modified version of the Stirling Cycle. The sealed cylinders filled with water are heated from one end to a temperature above the normal boiling point of water, but because of the limited volume within the cylinder the water can not change phase. Instead, the water expands, in the process pushing the piston inside the cylinder. The opposite end of the cylinder is cooled by the air, or alternatively a coolant fluid, and thus the cylinder compresses once more, completing the Stirling cycle.
