= Pseudo Stirling cycle =

The pseudo Stirling cycle, also known as the adiabatic Stirling cycle, is a thermodynamic cycle with an adiabatic working volume and isothermal heater and cooler, in contrast to the ideal Stirling cycle with an isothermal working space. The working fluid has no bearing on the maximum thermal efficiencies of the pseudo Stirling cycle.

Practical Stirling engines usually use a adiabatic Stirling cycle as the ideal Stirling cycle can not be practically implemented. Nomenclature (practical engines and ideal cycle are both named Stirling) and lack in specificity (omitting ideal or adiabatic Stirling cycle) can cause confusion.

== History ==
The pseudo Stirling cycle was designed to address predictive shortcomings in the ideal isothermal Stirling cycle. Specifically, the ideal cycle does not give usable figures or criteria for judging the performance of real-world Stirling engines.

== See also ==
- Stirling engine
- Stirling cycle
