= Vuilleumier cycle =

The Vuilleumier cycle was patented by a Swiss-American engineer named Rudolph Vuilleumier in 1918. The purpose of Vuilleumier's machine was to create a heat pump that would use heat at high temperature as energy input. The Vuilleumier cycle...

utilize[s] working gas expansion and compression at three variable volume spaces in order to pump heat from a low to a moderate temperature level. The interesting characteristic of the Vuilleumier machine is that the induced volume variations are realized without the use of work, but thermally. This is the reason why it has a potential to operate at modern applications where the pollution of the environment is not a choice. It is a perfect candidate for such applications, as it consists only of metallic parts and inert gas. Using these units for heating and cooling buildings, large energy savings can be accomplished as they can be operated at small scale in common buildings or at large scale providing heat power to entire building blocks without using fossil fuels. The use of Vuilleumier machines for industrial applications or inside vehicles is also a feasible option. Another field where these machines have already been involved is cryogenics, as they are also able to provide refrigeration at very low temperatures like the very similar and well-known Stirling refrigerators.

The Vuilleumier cycle is a thermodynamic cycle with applications in low-temperature cooling. In some respects it resembles a Stirling cycle or engine, although it has two "displacers" with a mechanical linkage connecting them as compared to one in the Stirling cycle. The hot displacer is larger than the cold displacer. The coupling maintains the appropriate phase difference. The displacers do no work—they are not pistons. Thus no work is required in an ideal case to operate the cycle. In reality friction and other losses mean that some work is required.

Devices operating on this cycle have been able to produce temperatures as low as 15 K using liquid nitrogen to pre-cool. Without precooling 77 K was reached with a heat flow of 1 W.

The cycle was first patented by Vuilleumier in 1918 with patent US1275507, and again in Leiden by KW Taconis in 1951. In March 2014, the Vuilleumier Cycle was tested in application with updating conventional HVAC (heating, ventilation, and air-conditioning) systems by utilizing the cycle's proposed thermodynamic process of moving heat energy, and having results of increased output efficiencies coupled with a reduced carbon footprint. This work was completed by ThermoLift), a company based out of the Advanced Energy Research and Technology Center at Stony Brook University, with collaboration from the US Department of Energy and the New York State Energy Research and Development Authority (NYSERDA). This work culminated in the demonstration of the ThermoLift system at Oak Ridge National Laboratory in August, 2018. The demonstration showed that the ThermoLift technology (TCHP), is able to achieve coefficients of performance (COP) for the cycle that well exceeded the DOE’s target COPs for cold-climate heat pumps (although not at all exceeding Geothermal heat pump efficiencies). Furthermore, due to the nature of the TCHP, there is no significant capacity decrease as the inlet temperature to the cold HX decreases.
