= Diesel cycle =

Engine combustion process

The Diesel cycle is a combustion process of a reciprocating internal combustion engine. In it, fuel is ignited by heat generated during the compression of air in the combustion chamber, into which fuel is then injected. This is in contrast to igniting the fuel-air mixture with a spark plug as in the Otto cycle (four-stroke/petrol) engine. Diesel engines are used in aircraft, automobiles, power generation, diesel–electric locomotives, and both surface ships and submarines.

The Diesel cycle is assumed to have constant pressure during the initial part of the combustion phase ($V_2$ to $V_3$ in the diagram, below). This is an idealized mathematical model: real physical diesels do have an increase in pressure during this period, but it is less pronounced than in the Otto cycle. In contrast, the idealized Otto cycle of a gasoline engine approximates a constant volume process during that phase.

== Idealized Diesel cycle ==
p–V diagram for the ideal Diesel cycle. The cycle follows the numbers 1–4 in clockwise direction.

The image shows a p–V diagram for the ideal Diesel cycle; where $p$ is pressure and V the volume or $v$ the specific volume if the process is placed on a unit mass basis. The idealized Diesel cycle assumes an ideal gas and ignores combustion chemistry, exhaust- and recharge procedures and simply follows four distinct processes:

- 1→2 : isentropic compression of the fluid (blue)
- 2→3 : constant pressure heating (red)
- 3→4 : isentropic expansion (yellow)
- 4→1 : constant volume cooling (green)

The Diesel engine is a heat engine: it converts heat into work. During the bottom isentropic processes (blue), energy is transferred into the system in the form of work $W_{in}$, but by definition (isentropic) no energy is transferred into or out of the system in the form of heat. During the constant pressure (red, isobaric) process, energy enters the system as heat $Q_{in}$. During the top isentropic processes (yellow), energy is transferred out of the system in the form of $W_{out}$, but by definition (isentropic) no energy is transferred into or out of the system in the form of heat. During the constant volume (green, isochoric) process, some of the energy flows out of the system as heat through the right depressurizing process $Q_{out}$. The work that leaves the system is equal to the work that enters the system plus the difference between the heat added to the system and the heat that leaves the system; in other words, net gain of work is equal to the difference between the heat added to the system and the heat that leaves the system.

- Work in ($W_{in}$) is done by the piston compressing the air (system)
- Heat in ($Q_{in}$) is done by the combustion of the fuel
- Work out ($W_{out}$) is done by the working fluid expanding and pushing a piston (this produces usable work)
- Heat out ($Q_{out}$) is done by venting the air
- Net work produced = $Q_{in}$ - $Q_{out}$

The net work produced is also represented by the area enclosed by the cycle on the p–V diagram. The net work is produced per cycle and is also called the useful work, as it can be turned to other useful types of energy and propel a vehicle (kinetic energy) or produce electrical energy. The summation of many such cycles per unit of time is called the developed power. The $W_{out}$ is also called the gross work, some of which is used in the next cycle of the engine to compress the next charge of air.

=== Maximum thermal efficiency ===
The maximum thermal efficiency of a Diesel cycle is dependent on the compression ratio and the cut-off ratio. It has the following formula under cold air standard analysis:

$$\eta_\text{th} = 1-\frac{1}{r^{\gamma-1}} \cdot \frac{\alpha^{\gamma}-1}{\gamma(\alpha-1)}$$

where

- $\eta_\text{th}$ is thermal efficiency
- $\alpha$ is the cut-off ratio $\frac{V_3}{V_2}$ (ratio between the end and start volume for the combustion phase)
- r is the compression ratio $\frac{V_1}{V_2}$
- $\gamma$ is ratio of specific heats (C_{p}/C_{V})

The cut-off ratio can be expressed in terms of temperature as shown below:
$$\begin{align}
\frac{T_2}{T_1} &= \left(\frac{V_1}{V_2}\right)^{\gamma-1} = r^{\gamma-1} \\[1ex]
T_2 &= T_1 r^{\gamma-1} \\[1ex]
\frac{V_3}{V_2} &= \frac{T_3}{T_2} \\[1ex]
\alpha &= \frac{T_3}{T_1} \cdot \frac{1}{r^{\gamma-1}}
\end{align}$$

$T_3$ can be approximated to the flame temperature of the fuel used. The flame temperature can be approximated to the adiabatic flame temperature of the fuel with corresponding air-to-fuel ratio and compression pressure, $p_3$. $T_1$ can be approximated to the inlet air temperature.

This formula only gives the ideal thermal efficiency. The actual thermal efficiency will be significantly lower due to heat and friction losses. The formula is more complex than the Otto cycle (petrol/gasoline engine) relation that has the following formula:

$$\eta_\text{Otto, th} = 1 - \frac{1}{r^{\gamma-1}}$$

The additional complexity for the Diesel formula comes around since the heat addition is at constant pressure and the heat rejection is at constant volume. The Otto cycle by comparison has both the heat addition and rejection at constant volume.

=== Comparing efficiency to Otto cycle ===
Comparing the two formulae it can be seen that for a given compression ratio (r), the ideal Otto cycle will be more efficient. However, a real diesel engine will be more efficient overall since it will have the ability to operate at higher compression ratios. If a petrol engine were to have the same compression ratio, then knocking (self-ignition) would occur and this would severely reduce the efficiency, whereas in a diesel engine, the self ignition is the desired behavior. Additionally, both of these cycles are only idealizations, and the actual behavior does not divide as clearly or sharply. Furthermore, the ideal Otto cycle formula stated above does not include throttling losses, which do not apply to diesel engines.

== Applications ==
=== Diesel engines ===
Diesel engines have the lowest specific fuel consumption of any large internal combustion engine employing a single cycle, 0.26 lb/hp·h (0.16 kg/kWh) for very large marine engines (combined cycle power plants are more efficient, but employ two engines rather than one). Two-stroke diesels with high pressure forced induction, particularly turbocharging, make up a large percentage of the very largest diesel engines.

In North America, diesel engines are primarily used in large trucks, where the low-stress, high-efficiency cycle leads to much longer engine life and lower operational costs. These advantages also make the diesel engine ideal for use in the heavy-haul railroad and earthmoving environments.

=== Other internal combustion engines without spark plugs ===
Many model airplanes use very simple "glow" and "diesel" engines. Glow engines use glow plugs. "Diesel" model airplane engines have variable compression ratios. Both types depend on special fuels.

Some 19th-century or earlier experimental engines used external flames, exposed by valves, for ignition, but this becomes less attractive with increasing compression. (It was the research of Nicolas Léonard Sadi Carnot that established the thermodynamic value of compression.) A historical implication of this is that the diesel engine could have been invented without the aid of electricity.
See the development of the hot-bulb engine and indirect injection for historical significance.

== See also ==
- Diesel engine
- Hot-bulb engine
- Mixed/dual cycle
- Partially premixed combustion
