= External combustion engine =

Type of reciprocating heat engine

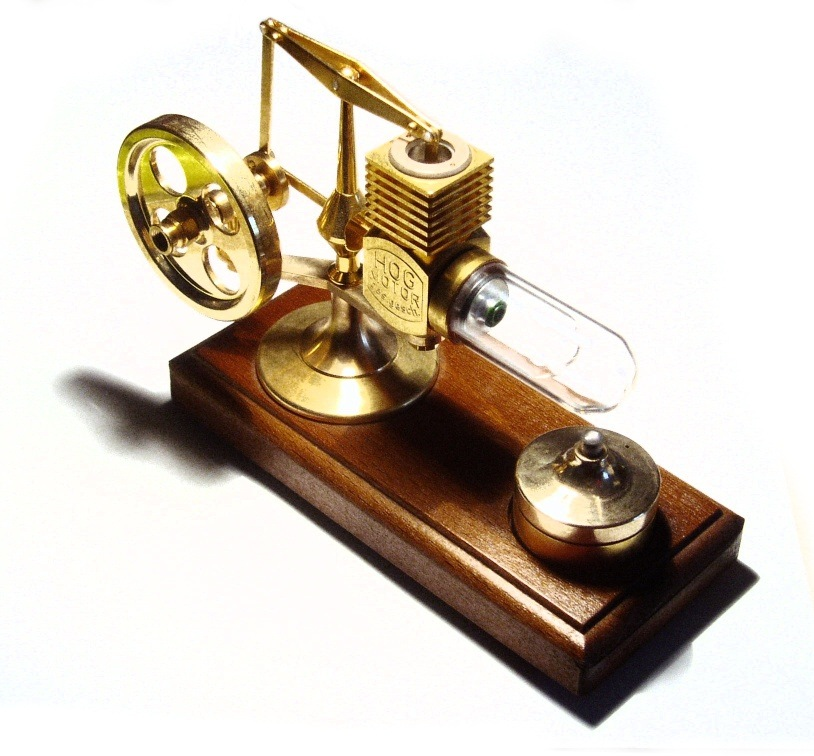
Model Stirling engine, with external heat from a spirit lamp (bottom right) applied to the outside of the glass displacer cylinder.

Newcomen's engine, a precursor of the steam engine, with the boiler heated from beneath

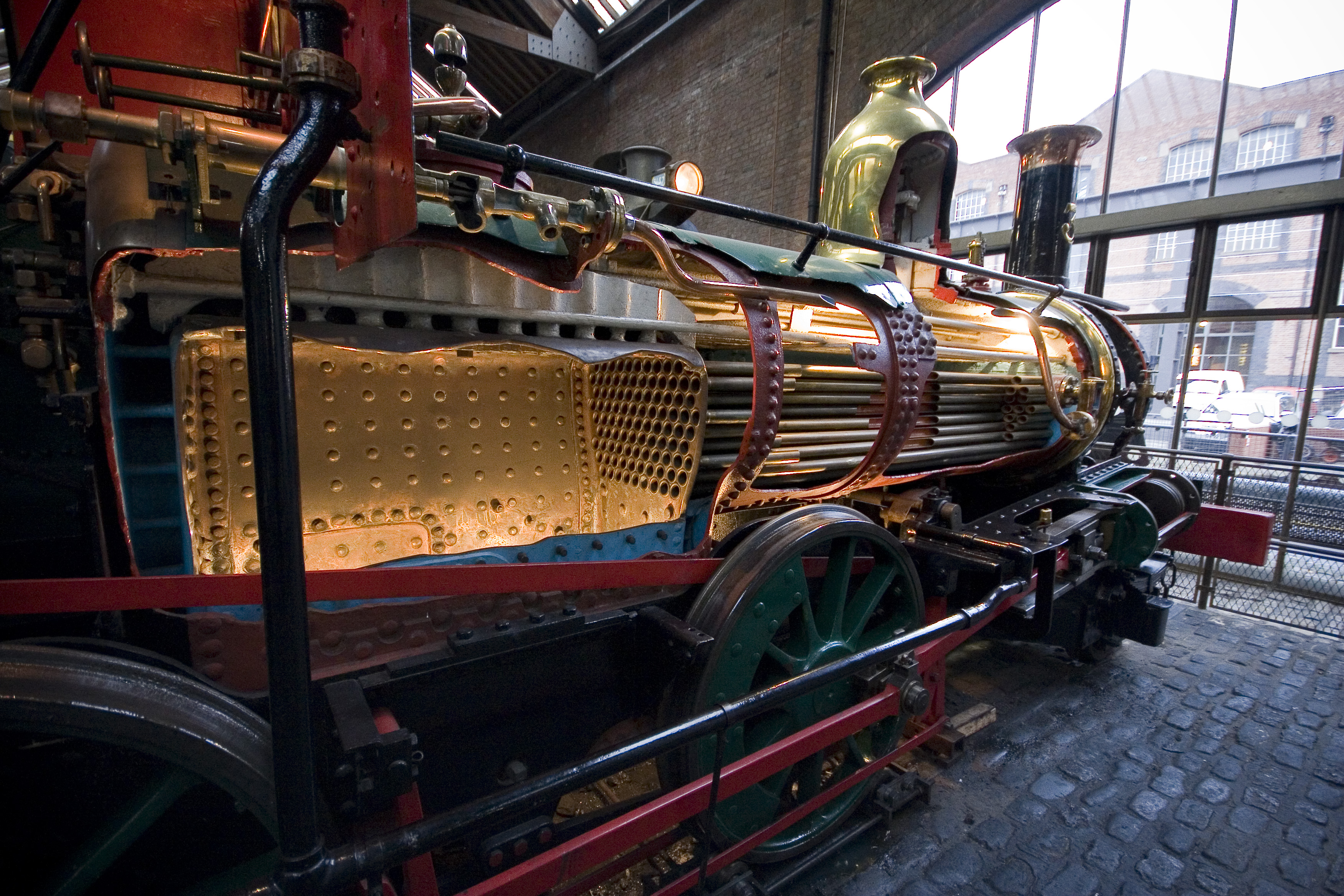
Sectioned steam locomotive. Although the fire is within an enclosed firebox, this is still an external combustion engine, as the exhaust gas and the steam working fluid are kept separate.

An external combustion engine (EC engine) is a reciprocating heat engine where a working fluid, contained internally, is heated by combustion in an external source, through the engine wall or a heat exchanger. The fluid then, by expanding and acting on the mechanism of the engine, produces motion and usable work. The fluid is then dumped (open cycle), or cooled, compressed and reused (closed cycle). In these types of engines, the combustion is primarily used as a heat source, and the engine can work equally well with other types of heat sources.

== Combustion ==
"Combustion" refers to burning fuel with an oxidizer, to supply the heat. Engines of similar (or even identical) configuration and operation may use a supply of heat from other sources such as nuclear, solar, geothermal or exothermic reactions not involving combustion; they are not then strictly classed as external combustion engines, but as external thermal engines.

== Working fluid ==
The working fluid can be of any composition and the system may be single-phase (liquid only or gas only) or dual-phase (liquid/gas).

Working fluids for external combustion engines include air, hot water, pressurized water or even boiler-heated liquid sodium.

=== Single phase ===
Gas is used in a Stirling engine. Single-phase liquid may sometimes be used.

=== Dual phase ===
Dual-phase external combustion engines use a phase transition to convert temperature to usable work, for example from liquid to (generally much larger) gas. This type of engine follows variants of the Rankine cycle. Steam engines are a common example of dual-phase engines. Another example is engines that use the Organic Rankine cycle.

== See also ==
- Organic Rankine cycle
- Steam engines
- Stirling engines
- Trochilic engine
- Internal combustion engine (ICE)
- Nuclear power
- Solar thermal rocket (an externally heated rocket)
- Naptha engine, a variant of the steam engine, using a petroleum liquid as both fuel and working fluid.
