= Isochoric process =

Thermodynamic process of a closed system in which volume remains constant

In thermodynamics, an isochoric process, also called a constant-volume process, an isovolumetric process, or an isometric process, is a thermodynamic process during which the volume of the closed system undergoing such a process remains constant. An isochoric process is exemplified by the heating or the cooling of the contents of a sealed, inelastic container: The thermodynamic process is the addition or removal of heat; the isolation of the contents of the container establishes the closed system; and the inability of the container to deform imposes the constant-volume condition.

== Formalism ==
An isochoric thermodynamic quasi-static process is characterized by constant volume, i.e., ΔV = 0. The process does no pressure-volume work, since such work is defined by
$$W = P \Delta V ,$$
where P is pressure. The sign convention is such that positive work is performed by the system on the environment.

If the process is not quasi-static, the work can perhaps be done in a volume constant thermodynamic process.

For a reversible process, the first law of thermodynamics gives the change in the system's internal energy:
$$dU = dQ - dW$$

Replacing work with a change in volume gives
$$dU = dQ - P \, dV$$

Since the process is isochoric, dV = 0, the previous equation now gives
$$dU = dQ$$

Using the definition of specific heat capacity at constant volume, c_{v} = (dQ/dT)/m, where m is the mass of the gas, we get
$$dQ = m c_\mathrm{v} \, dT$$

Integrating both sides yields
$$\Delta Q\ = m \int_{T_1}^{T_2} \! c_\mathrm{v} \, dT,$$
where c_{v} is the specific heat capacity at constant volume, T_{1} is the initial temperature and T_{2} is the final temperature. We conclude with:
$$\Delta Q\ = m c_\mathrm{v} \Delta T$$

Isochoric process in the pressure volume diagram. In this diagram, pressure increases, but volume remains constant.

On a pressure volume diagram, an isochoric process appears as a straight vertical line. Its thermodynamic conjugate, an isobaric process would appear as a straight horizontal line.

=== Ideal gas ===
If an ideal gas is used in an isochoric process, and the quantity of gas stays constant, then the increase in energy is proportional to an increase in temperature and pressure. For example a gas heated in a rigid container: the pressure and temperature of the gas will increase, but the volume will remain the same.

== Ideal Otto cycle ==
The ideal Otto cycle is an example of an isochoric process when it is assumed that the burning of the gasoline-air mixture in an internal combustion engine car is instantaneous. There is an increase in the temperature and the pressure of the gas inside the cylinder while the volume remains the same.

== Etymology ==
The noun "isochor" and the adjective "isochoric" are derived from the Greek words ἴσος (isos) meaning "equal", and χῶρος (khôros) meaning "space."

== See also ==
- Isobaric process
- Adiabatic process
- Cyclic process
- Incompressible flow
- Isothermal process
- Polytropic process
