= Reversible process (thermodynamics) =

Process whose direction can be reversed

In thermodynamics, a reversible process is a process, involving a system and its surroundings, whose direction can be reversed by infinitesimal changes in some properties of the surroundings, such as pressure or temperature.

Throughout an entire reversible process, the system is in thermodynamic equilibrium, both physical and chemical, and nearly in pressure and temperature equilibrium with its surroundings. This prevents unbalanced forces and acceleration of moving system boundaries, which in turn avoids friction and other dissipation.

To maintain equilibrium, reversible processes are extremely slow (quasistatic). The process must occur slowly enough that after some small change in a thermodynamic parameter, the physical processes in the system have enough time for the other parameters to self-adjust to match the new, changed parameter value. For example, if a container of water has sat in a room long enough to match the steady temperature of the surrounding air, for a small change in the air temperature to be reversible, the whole system of air, water, and container must wait long enough for the container and air to settle into a new, matching temperature before the next small change can occur. (Note: The absolute standard for "fast" and "slow" thermodynamic change is the maximum amount of time required for a temperature change (and the consequential changes in pressure, etc.) to travel across each of the parts of the whole system. However, depending on the system or the process considered, thermodynamically "slow" might sometimes seem "fast" in human terms: In the example of the container and room air, if the container is just a porcelain coffee cup, heat can flow fairly quickly between the small object and the larger room. In a different version of the same process where the container is a 40 gallon metal tank of water, one might intuitively expect rematching of temperatures ("equilibration") of the coffee cup to only require a few minutes, which is fast by comparison to the hours one could expect for a 40 gallon tank of water. Each different physical aspect of a system either increases or reduces the amount of time required for the whole system to re-establish its thermodynamic equilibrium after a small disturbance, and hence changes the time required for a "quasistatic" change. The number of aspects one might consider can become either tedious or overwhelming: The metal skin of the tank will conduct heat more quickly than the porcelain, so that speeds up equilibration, but the much larger mass of water – whose surface is actually smaller in proportion to its volume – will slow down the restoration of equilibrium. If the coffee cup has no lid, then evaporative cooling could speed up its equilibration even more, compared to an almost-sealed tank with only an open, narrow spigot. If the spigot is closed so the tank is sealed, how "springy" its walls are for adapting to consequent pressure change affects the speed of equilibration. Further issues involve whether the room air is stagnant or has forced air circulation (a fan); if the tank nearly fills the room, the smaller amount of heat in the air relative to the heat in the tank may speed up the temperatures settling out; radiative cooling rates depend even on what color the tank is; and so on. Although standard practice is to ignore as much detail as possible, an ignored process might in fact be the slowest process in the system, and hence set the standard for what "slow" is for a quasistatic change. Physicists and engineers tend to be defensively vague about how long one must wait, and in practice allow ample or excessive time for equilibrium to re-establish. A experimenter wanting to proceed as quickly as possible can determine the settling time empirically, by placing accurate thermometers throughout the whole system: Equilibration is complete once every one of the thermometers in the system resumes reading the same value as all the others, and the system is then ready for the next small temperature change.) While processes in isolated systems are never reversible, cyclical processes can be reversible or irreversible. Reversible processes are hypothetical or idealized but central to the second law of thermodynamics. Melting or freezing of ice in water is an example of a realistic process that is nearly reversible. Other real processes which can occur reversibly are the reversible mixing of substances in gas or liquid phase through semipermeable membranes. The reversible mixing is involved in defining the entropy of mixtures. Reversibility is also present in electrochemical generators of electric energy, such as the one mentioned by Gibbs, perfectly reversible electrochemical apparatus.

Additionally, the system must be in (quasistatic) equilibrium with the surroundings at all time, and there must be no dissipative effects, such as friction, for a process to be considered reversible.

Reversible processes are useful in thermodynamics because by being idealized the equations for heat and expansion/compression work are simple. This enables the analysis of model processes, which usually define the maximum efficiency attainable as work in corresponding real processes. Other applications exploit that entropy and internal energy are state functions whose change depends only on the initial and final states of the system, not on how the process occurred. Therefore, the entropy and internal-energy change in a real process can be calculated quite easily by analyzing a reversible process connecting the real initial and final system states. In addition, reversibility defines the thermodynamic condition for chemical equilibrium.

== Overview ==
Thermodynamic processes can be carried out in one of two ways: reversibly or irreversibly. An ideal thermodynamically reversible process is free of dissipative losses and therefore the magnitude of work performed by or on the system would be maximized. The incomplete conversion of heat to work in a cyclic process, however, applies to both reversible and irreversible cycles. The dependence of work on the path of the thermodynamic process is also unrelated to reversibility, since expansion work, which can be visualized on a pressure–volume diagram as the area beneath the equilibrium curve, is different for different reversible expansion processes (e.g. adiabatic, then isothermal; vs. isothermal, then adiabatic) connecting the same initial and final states.

== Irreversibility ==
In an irreversible process, finite changes are made; therefore the system is not at equilibrium throughout the process. In a cyclic process, the difference between the reversible work $(\, W_\mathsf{rev} \,)$ and the actual work $(\, W_\mathsf{act} \,)$ for a process as shown in the following equation: $\; I = W_\mathsf{rev} - W_\mathsf{act} ~.$

== Boundaries and states ==
Simple reversible processes change the state of a system in such a way that the net change in the combined entropy of the system and its surroundings is zero. (The entropy of the system alone is conserved only in reversible adiabatic processes.) Nevertheless, the Carnot cycle demonstrates that the state of the surroundings may change in a reversible process as the system returns to its initial state. Reversible processes define the boundaries of how efficient heat engines can be in thermodynamics and engineering: a reversible process is one where the machine has maximum efficiency (see Carnot cycle).

Reversible adiabatic process: The state on the left can be reached from the state on the right as well as vice versa without exchanging heat with the environment.

In some cases, it may be important to distinguish between reversible and quasistatic processes. Reversible processes are always quasistatic, but the converse is not always true. For example, an infinitesimal compression of a gas in a cylinder where there is friction between the piston and the cylinder is a quasistatic, but not reversible process. Although the system has been driven from its equilibrium state by only an infinitesimal amount, energy has been irreversibly lost to waste heat, due to friction, and cannot be recovered by simply moving the piston in the opposite direction by the infinitesimally same amount.

== Engineering archaisms ==
Historically, the term Tesla principle was used to describe (among other things) certain reversible processes invented by Nikola Tesla. However, this phrase is no longer in conventional use. The principle stated that some systems could be reversed and operated in a complementary manner. It was developed during Tesla's research in alternating currents where the current's magnitude and direction varied cyclically. During a demonstration of the Tesla turbine, the disks revolved and machinery fastened to the shaft was operated by the engine. If the turbine's operation was reversed, the disks acted as a pump.

== See also ==
- Time reversibility
- Carnot cycle
- Entropy production
- Toffoli gate
- Time evolution
- Quantum circuit
- Reversible computing
- Maxwell's demon
- Stirling engine
