= Isobaric process =

Thermodynamic process in which pressure remains constant

In thermodynamics, an isobaric process is a type of thermodynamic process in which the pressure of the system stays constant: ΔP = 0. The heat transferred to the system does work, but also changes the internal energy (U) of the system. This article uses the physics sign convention for work, where positive work is work done by the system. Using this convention, by the first law of thermodynamics,

The yellow area represents the work done

$$Q = \Delta U + W\,$$

where W is work, U is internal energy, and Q is heat. Pressure-volume work by the closed system is defined as:

$$W = \int \! p \,dV \,$$

where Δ means change over the whole process, whereas d denotes a differential. Since pressure is constant, this means that

$$W = p \Delta V\,$$.

Applying the ideal gas law, this becomes

$$W = n\,R\,\Delta T$$

with R representing the gas constant, and n representing the amount of substance, which is assumed to remain constant (e.g., there is no phase transition during a chemical reaction). According to the equipartition theorem, the change in internal energy is related to the temperature of the system by

$$\Delta U = n\,c_{V,m}\,\Delta T$$,

where c_{V, m} is molar heat capacity at a constant volume.

Substituting the last two equations into the first equation produces:

$$\begin{align}
Q &= n\,c_{V,m}\,\Delta T + n\,R\,\Delta T \\
Q &= n\Delta T(c_{V,m}+R) \\
Q &= n\Delta T c_{P,m}
\end{align}$$

where c_{P} is molar heat capacity at a constant pressure.

== Specific heat capacity ==
To find the molar specific heat capacity of the gas involved, the following equations apply for any general gas that is calorically perfect. The property γ is either called the adiabatic index or the heat capacity ratio. Some published sources might use k instead of γ.

Molar isochoric specific heat:

$$c_V = \frac{R}{\gamma - 1}$$.

Molar isobaric specific heat:

$$c_p = \frac{\gamma R}{\gamma - 1}$$.

The values for γ are γ = 7/5 for diatomic gases like air and its major components, and γ = 5/3 for monatomic gases like the noble gases. The formulas for specific heats would reduce in these special cases:

Monatomic:

$c_V = \tfrac32 R$ and $c_P = \tfrac52 R$

Diatomic:

$c_V = \tfrac52 R$ and $c_P = \tfrac72 R$

An isobaric process is shown on a P–V diagram as a straight horizontal line, connecting the initial and final thermostatic states. If the process moves towards the right, then it is an expansion. If the process moves towards the left, then it is a compression.

== Sign convention for work ==
The motivation for the specific sign conventions of thermodynamics comes from early development of heat engines. When designing a heat engine, the goal is to have the system produce and deliver work output. The source of energy in a heat engine, is a heat input.

- If the volume compresses (ΔV = final volume − initial volume < 0), then W < 0. That is, during isobaric compression the gas does negative work, or the environment does positive work. Restated, the environment does positive work on the gas.
- If the volume expands (ΔV = final volume − initial volume > 0), then W > 0. That is, during isobaric expansion the gas does positive work, or equivalently, the environment does negative work. Restated, the gas does positive work on the environment.
- If heat is added to the system, then Q > 0. That is, during isobaric expansion/heating, positive heat is added to the gas, or equivalently, the environment receives negative heat. Restated, the gas receives positive heat from the environment.
- If the system rejects heat, then Q < 0. That is, during isobaric compression/cooling, negative heat is added to the gas, or equivalently, the environment receives positive heat. Restated, the environment receives positive heat from the gas.

== Defining enthalpy ==
An isochoric process is described by the equation Q = ΔU. It would be convenient to have a similar equation for isobaric processes. Substituting the second equation into the first yields

$$Q = \Delta U + \Delta (p\,V) = \Delta (U + p\,V)$$

The quantity U + pV is a state function that is called enthalpy, and is denoted as H. Therefore, an isobaric process can be more succinctly described as

$$Q = \Delta H \,$$.

Enthalpy and isochoric specific heat capacity are very useful mathematical constructs, since when analyzing a process in an open system, the situation of zero work occurs when the fluid flows at constant pressure. In an open system, enthalpy is the quantity which is useful to use to keep track of energy content of the fluid.

== Examples of isobaric processes ==
The reversible expansion of an ideal gas can be used as an example of an isobaric process. Of particular interest is the way heat is converted to work when expansion is carried out at different working gas/surrounding gas pressures.

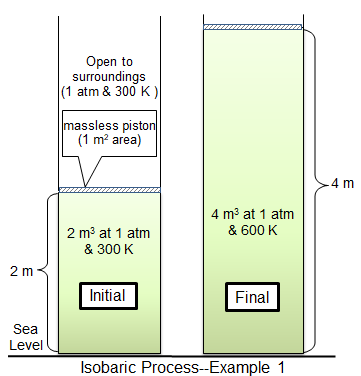
Isobaric expansion of 2 cubic meters of air at 300 Kelvin to 4 cubic meters, causing the temperature to increase to 600 Kelvin while the pressure remains the same.

In the first process example, a cylindrical chamber 1 m^{2} in area encloses 81.2438 mol of an ideal diatomic gas of molecular mass 29 g mol^{−1} at 300 K. The surrounding gas is at 1 atm and 300 K, and separated from the cylinder gas by a thin piston. For the limiting case of a massless piston, the cylinder gas is also at 1 atm pressure, with an initial volume of 2 m^{3}. Heat is added slowly until the gas temperature is uniformly 600 K, after which the gas volume is 4 m^{3} and the piston is 2 m above its initial position. If the piston motion is sufficiently slow, the gas pressure at each instant will have practically the same value (p_{sys} = 1 atm) throughout.

For a thermally perfect diatomic gas, the molar specific heat capacity at constant pressure (c_{p}) is ^{7}/_{2}R or 29.1006 J mol^{−1} deg^{−1}. The molar heat capacity at constant volume (c_{v}) is ^{5}/_{2}R or 20.7862 J mol^{−1} deg^{−1}. The ratio $\gamma$ of the two heat capacities is 1.4.

The heat Q required to bring the gas from 300 to 600 K is

$$Q = {\Delta\Eta} = n\,c_p\,\Delta\Tau  = 81.2438\times 29.1006\times 300 = 709,274\text{ J}$$.

The increase in internal energy is

$$\Delta\ U = n\,c_v\,\Delta\Tau  = 81.2438\times 20.7862\times 300 = 506,625\text{ J}$$

Therefore, $W = Q - \Delta U = 202,649\text{ J} = nR\Delta\Tau$

Also

$W = {p\Delta\nu} = 1~\text{atm} \times 2\text{m3} \times 101325\text{Pa} = 202,650\text{ J}$, which of course is identical to the difference between ΔH and ΔU.

Here, work is entirely consumed by expansion against the surroundings. Of the total heat applied (709.3 kJ), the work performed (202.7 kJ) is about 28.6% of the supplied heat.

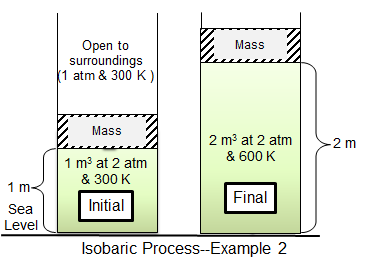
Isobaric expansion of a gas pressurized to 2 atmospheres by a 10,333.2 kg mass. Like before, the gas doubles in volume and temperature while remaining at the same pressure.

The second process example is similar to the first, except that the massless piston is replaced by one having a mass of 10,332.2 kg, which doubles the pressure of the cylinder gas to 2 atm. The cylinder gas volume is then 1 m^{3} at the initial 300 K temperature. Heat is added slowly until the gas temperature is uniformly 600 K, after which the gas volume is 2 m^{3} and the piston is 1 m above its initial position. If the piston motion is sufficiently slow, the gas pressure at each instant will have practically the same value (p_{sys} = 2 atm) throughout.

Since enthalpy and internal energy are independent of pressure,

$Q = {\Delta\Eta} = 709,274\text{ J}$ and $\Delta U = 506,625\text{ J}$.
$$W = {p\Delta V} = 2~\text{atm} \times 1~\text{m3}\times 101325\text{Pa} = 202,650\text{ J}$$

As in the first example, about 28.6% of the supplied heat is converted to work. But here, work is applied in two different ways: partly by expanding the surrounding atmosphere and partly by lifting 10,332.2 kg a distance h of 1 m.

$$W_{\rm lift} = 10\,332.2~\text{kg} \times 9.80665~\text{m/s²}\times1\text{m} = 101,324\text{ J}$$

Thus, half the work lifts the piston mass (work of gravity, or “useable” work), while the other half expands the surroundings.

The results of these two process examples illustrate the difference between the fraction of heat converted to usable work (mgΔh) vs. the fraction converted to pressure-volume work done against the surrounding atmosphere. The usable work approaches zero as the working gas pressure approaches that of the surroundings, while maximum usable work is obtained when there is no surrounding gas pressure. The ratio of all work performed to the heat input for ideal isobaric gas expansion is

$$\frac{W}{Q} = \frac{nR\Delta\Tau}{nc_p\Delta\Tau}   = \frac{2}{5}$$

== Variable density viewpoint ==
A given quantity (mass m) of gas in a changing volume produces a change in density ρ. In this context the ideal gas law is written

$$R(T\,\rho) = M P$$

where T is thermodynamic temperature and M is molar mass. When R and M are taken as constant, then pressure P can stay constant as the density-temperature quadrant (ρ,T) undergoes a squeeze mapping.

== Etymology ==
The adjective "isobaric" is derived from the Greek words ἴσος (isos) meaning "equal", and βάρος (baros) meaning "weight."

== See also ==
- Adiabatic process
- Cyclic process
- Isochoric process
- Isothermal process
- Polytropic process
- Isenthalpic process
