= Quantum thermodynamics =

Study of the relations between thermodynamics and quantum mechanics

Quantum thermodynamics is the study of the relations between two independent physical theories: thermodynamics and quantum mechanics. The two independent theories address the physical phenomena of light and matter. In 1905, Albert Einstein argued that the requirement of consistency between thermodynamics and electromagnetism leads to the conclusion that light is quantized, obtaining the relation $E= h \nu$. This paper is the dawn of quantum theory. In a few decades quantum theory became established with an independent set of rules. Currently quantum thermodynamics addresses the emergence of thermodynamic laws from quantum mechanics. It differs from quantum statistical mechanics in the emphasis on dynamical processes out of equilibrium. In addition, there is a quest for the theory to be relevant for a single individual quantum system. The first university course titled "Quantum Thermodynamics" was offered at MIT in the spring of 1971 by George Hatsopoulos and Elias Gyftopoulos. The course, numbered 2.47J, was a graduate-level offering.

== Dynamical view ==
There is an intimate connection of quantum thermodynamics with the theory of open quantum systems. Quantum mechanics inserts dynamics into thermodynamics, giving a sound foundation to finite-time-thermodynamics. The main assumption is that the entire world is a large closed system, and therefore, time evolution is governed by a unitary transformation generated by a global Hamiltonian. For the combined system bath scenario, the global Hamiltonian can be decomposed into:
$$H=H_\text{S}+H_\text{B}+H_\text{SB}$$
where $H_\text{S}$ is the system Hamiltonian, $H_\text{B}$ is the bath Hamiltonian and $H_\text{SB}$ is the system-bath interaction.

The state of the system is obtained from a partial trace over the combined system and bath:

$\rho_\text{S} (t) = \operatorname{Tr}_\text{B} (\rho_\text{SB} (t)) .$

Reduced dynamics is an equivalent description of the system dynamics utilizing only system operators. Assuming Markov property for the dynamics the basic equation of motion for an open quantum system is the Lindblad equation (GKLS):
$$\dot\rho_\text{S}=-{i\over\hbar}[H_\text{S},\rho_\text{S}]+L_\text{D}(\rho_\text{S})$$
$H_\text{S}$ is a (Hermitian) Hamiltonian part and $L_\text{D}$:
$$L_\text{D}(\rho_\text{S}) = \sum_n \left[V_n \rho_\text{S} V_n^\dagger - \tfrac{1}{2} \left(\rho_\text{S} V_n^\dagger V_n + V_n^\dagger V_n \rho_\text{S}\right)\right]$$
is the dissipative part describing implicitly through system operators $V_n$ the influence of the bath on the system. The Markov property imposes that the system and bath are uncorrelated at all times $\rho_\text{SB}=\rho_s \otimes \rho_\text{B}$. Thermodynamics imposes additional restrictions on the relation between $L_\text{D}$ and the Hamiltonian to impose proper thermal equilibrium. The L-GKS equation is unidirectional and leads any initial state $\rho_\text{S}$ to a steady state solution which is an invariant of the equation of motion $\dot{\rho}_\text{S}(t \to \infty ) = 0$.

The Heisenberg picture supplies a direct link to quantum thermodynamic observables. The dynamics of a system observable represented by the operator, $O$, has the form:
$$\frac{d O}{dt} =\frac{i}{\hbar} [H_\text{S}, O ] +L_\text{D}^*(O)
+\frac{\partial O}{\partial t}$$
where the possibility that the operator, $O$ is explicitly time-dependent, is included.

=== Emergence of time derivative of first law of thermodynamics ===
When $O= H_\text{S}$ the first law of thermodynamics emerges:
$$\frac{d E}{dt} = \left\langle \frac{\partial H_\text{S}}{\partial t }\right\rangle + \langle L_\text{D}^* (H_\text{S}) \rangle$$
where power is interpreted as

$$P = \left\langle \frac{\partial H_\text{S}}{\partial t }\right\rangle$$

and the heat current

$$J = \left\langle L_\text{D}^* (H_\text{S}) \right\rangle.$$

Additional conditions have to be imposed on the dissipator $L_\text{D}$ to be consistent with thermodynamics.

First the invariant $\rho_\text{S}(\infty)$ should become an equilibrium Gibbs state. This implies that the dissipator $L_\text{D}$ should commute with the unitary part generated by $H_\text{S}$. In addition an equilibrium state is stationary and stable. This assumption is used to derive the Kubo-Martin-Schwinger stability criterion for thermal equilibrium i.e. KMS state.

A unique and consistent approach is obtained by deriving the generator, $L_\text{D}$, in the weak system bath coupling limit. In this limit, the interaction energy can be neglected. This approach represents a thermodynamic idealization: it allows energy transfer, while keeping a tensor product separation between the system and bath, i.e., a quantum version of an isothermal partition.

Markovian behavior involves a rather complicated cooperation between system and bath dynamics. This means that in phenomenological treatments, one cannot combine arbitrary system Hamiltonians, $H_\text{S}$, with a given L-GKS generator. This observation is particularly important in the context of quantum thermodynamics, where it is tempting to study Markovian dynamics with an arbitrary control Hamiltonian. Erroneous derivations of the quantum master equation can easily lead to a violation of the laws of thermodynamics.

An external perturbation modifying the Hamiltonian of the system will also modify the heat flow. As a result, the L-GKS generator has to be renormalized. For a slow change, one can adopt the adiabatic approach and use the instantaneous system's Hamiltonian to derive $L_\text{D}$. An important class of problems in quantum thermodynamics is periodically driven systems. Periodic quantum heat engines and power-driven refrigerators fall into this class.

A reexamination of the time-dependent heat current expression using quantum transport techniques has been proposed.

A derivation of consistent dynamics beyond the weak coupling limit has been suggested.

Phenomenological formulations of irreversible quantum dynamics consistent with the second law and implementing the geometric idea of "steepest entropy ascent" or "gradient flow" have been suggested to model relaxation and strong coupling.

=== Emergence of the second law ===
The second law of thermodynamics is a statement on the irreversibility of dynamics or, the breakup of time reversal symmetry (T-symmetry). This should be consistent with the empirical direct definition: heat will flow spontaneously from a hot source to a cold sink.

From a static viewpoint, for a closed quantum system, the 2nd law of thermodynamics is a consequence of the unitary evolution. In this approach, one accounts for the entropy change before and after a change in the entire system. A dynamical viewpoint is based on local accounting for the entropy changes in the subsystems and the entropy generated in the baths.

==== Entropy ====
In thermodynamics, entropy is related to the amount of energy of a system that can be converted into mechanical work in a concrete process. In quantum mechanics, this translates to the ability to measure and manipulate the system based on the information gathered by measurement. An example is the case of Maxwell's demon, which has been resolved by Leó Szilárd.

The entropy of an observable is associated with the complete projective measurement of an observable,$\langle A \rangle$, where the operator $A$ has a spectral decomposition:
$$A = \sum_j \alpha_j P_j,$$
where $P_j$ are the projection operators of the eigenvalue $\alpha_j.$ The probability of outcome $j$ is $p_j = \operatorname{Tr}(\rho P_j).$ The entropy associated with the observable $\langle A \rangle$ is the Shannon entropy with respect to the possible outcomes:
$$S_A =-\sum_j p_j \ln p_j$$

The most significant observable in thermodynamics is the energy represented by the Hamiltonian operator $H,$ and its associated energy entropy, $S_E.$

John von Neumann suggested to single out the most informative observable to characterize the entropy of the system. This invariant is obtained by minimizing the entropy with respect to all possible observables. The most informative observable operator commutes with the state of the system. The entropy of this observable is termed the Von Neumann entropy and is equal to
$$S_\text{vn} = - \operatorname{Tr}( \rho \ln \rho).$$
As a consequence, $S_A \ge S_\text{vn}$ for all observables. At thermal equilibrium the energy entropy is equal to the von Neumann entropy: $S_E =S_\text{vn}.$

$S_\text{vn}$ is invariant to a unitary transformation changing the state. The Von Neumann entropy $S_\text{vn}$ is additive only for a system state that is composed of a tensor product of its subsystems:
$$\rho = \Pi_j \otimes \rho_j$$

==== Clausius version of the II-law ====
No process is possible whose sole result is the transfer of heat from a body of lower temperature to a body of higher temperature.

This statement for N-coupled heat baths in steady state becomes
$$\sum_n \frac{J_n}{T_n} \ge 0$$

A dynamical version of the II-law can be proven, based on Spohn's inequality:
$$\operatorname{Tr} \left( L_\text{D} \rho \left[\ln \rho(\infty) - \ln \rho \right] \right) \ge 0,$$
which is valid for any L-GKS generator, with a stationary state, $\rho(\infty)$.

Consistency with thermodynamics can be employed to verify quantum dynamical models of transport. For example, local models for networks where local L-GKS equations are connected through weak links have been thought to violate the second law of thermodynamics. In 2018 has been shown that, by correctly taking into account all work and energy contributions in the full system, local master equations are fully coherent with the second law of thermodynamics.

=== Quantum and thermodynamic adiabatic conditions and quantum friction ===
Thermodynamic adiabatic processes have no entropy change. Typically, an external control modifies the state. A quantum version of an adiabatic process can be modeled by an externally controlled time dependent Hamiltonian $H(t)$. If the system is isolated, the dynamics are unitary, and therefore, $S_\text{vn}$ is a constant. A quantum adiabatic process is defined by the energy entropy $S_E$ being constant. The quantum adiabatic condition is therefore equivalent to no net change in the population of the instantaneous energy levels. This implies that the Hamiltonian should commute with itself at different times: $[H(t),H(t')] = 0$.

When the adiabatic conditions are not fulfilled, additional work is required to reach the final control value. For an isolated system, this work is recoverable, since the dynamics is unitary and can be reversed. In this case, quantum friction can be suppressed using shortcuts to adiabaticity as demonstrated in the laboratory using a unitary Fermi gas in a time-dependent trap.

The coherence stored in the off-diagonal elements of the density operator carry the required information to recover the extra energy cost and reverse the dynamics. Typically, this energy is not recoverable, due to interaction with a bath that causes energy dephasing. The bath, in this case, acts like a measuring apparatus of energy. This lost energy is the quantum version of friction.

=== Emergence of the dynamical version of the third law of thermodynamics ===
There are seemingly two independent formulations of the third law of thermodynamics. Both were originally stated by Walther Nernst. The first formulation is known as the Nernst heat theorem, and can be phrased as:

- The entropy of any pure substance in thermodynamic equilibrium approaches zero as the temperature approaches zero.

The second formulation is dynamical, known as the unattainability principle

- It is impossible by any procedure, no matter how idealized, to reduce any assembly to absolute zero temperature in a finite number of operations.

At steady state the second law of thermodynamics implies that the total entropy production is non-negative.

When the cold bath approaches the absolute zero temperature, it is necessary to eliminate the entropy production divergence at the cold side when $T_\text{c} \rightarrow 0$, therefore
$$\dot S_\text{c} \propto - T_\text{c}^{\alpha}~~~,~~~~\alpha \geq 0~~.$$
For $\alpha=0$ the fulfillment of the second law depends on the entropy production of the other baths, which should compensate for the negative entropy production of the cold bath.

The first formulation of the third law modifies this restriction. Instead of $\alpha \geq 0$ the third law imposes $\alpha > 0$, guaranteeing that at absolute zero the entropy production at the cold bath is zero: $\dot S_\text{c} = 0$. This requirement leads to the scaling condition of the heat current ${ J}_\text{c} \propto T_\text{c}^{\alpha+1}$.

The second formulation, known as the unattainability principle can be rephrased as;

- No refrigerator can cool a system to absolute zero temperature at finite time.

The dynamics of the cooling process is governed by the equation:
$${ J}_\text{c}(T_\text{c}(t)) = -c_V(T_\text{c}(t))\frac{dT_\text{c}(t)}{dt}~~.$$
where $c_V(T_\text{c})$ is the heat capacity of the bath. Taking ${ J}_\text{c} \propto T_\text{c}^{\alpha+1}$ and $c_V \sim T_\text{c}^{\eta}$ with ${\eta} \geq 0$, we can quantify this formulation by evaluating the characteristic exponent $\zeta$ of the cooling process,
$$\frac{dT_\text{c}(t)}{dt} \propto -T_\text{c}^{\zeta}, ~~~~~ T_\text{c} \to 0, \;\;\quad {\zeta=\alpha-\eta+1}$$

This equation introduces the relation between the characteristic exponents $\zeta$ and $\alpha$. When $\zeta < 0$ then the bath is cooled to zero temperature in a finite time, which implies a violation of the third law. It is apparent from the last equation, that the unattainability principle is more restrictive than the Nernst heat theorem.

== Typicality as a source of emergence of thermodynamic phenomena ==
The basic idea of quantum typicality is that the vast majority of all pure states featuring a common expectation value of some generic observable at a given time will yield very similar expectation values of the same observable at any later time. This is meant to apply to Schrödinger type dynamics in high dimensional Hilbert spaces. As a consequence individual dynamics of expectation values are then typically well described by the ensemble average.

Quantum ergodic theorem originated by John von Neumann is a strong result arising from the mere mathematical structure of quantum mechanics. The QET is a precise formulation of termed normal typicality, i.e. the statement that, for typical large systems, every initial wave function $\psi_0$ from an energy shell is 'normal': it evolves in such a way that $\psi_t$ for most t, is macroscopically equivalent to the micro-canonical density matrix.

== Resource theory ==
The second law of thermodynamics can be interpreted as quantifying state transformations which are statistically unlikely so that they become effectively forbidden. The second law typically applies to systems composed of many particles interacting; Quantum thermodynamics resource theory is a formulation of thermodynamics in the regime where it can be applied to a small number of particles interacting with a heat bath. For processes which are cyclic or very close to cyclic, the second law for microscopic systems takes on a very different form than it does at the macroscopic scale, imposing not just one constraint on what state transformations are possible, but an entire family of constraints. These second laws are not only relevant for small systems, but also apply to individual macroscopic systems interacting via long-range interactions, which only satisfy the ordinary second law on average. By making precise the definition of thermal operations, the laws of thermodynamics take on a form with the first law defining the class of thermal operations, the zeroth law emerging as a unique condition ensuring the theory is nontrivial, and the remaining laws being a monotonicity property of generalised free energies.

== Noncommuting conserved charges ==
Thermodynamic systems typically conserve quantities—known as charges—such as energy and particle number. These charges are often implicitly assumed to commute. This assumption underlies, for example, the derivation of thermal state forms, the Eigenstate Thermalization Hypothesis, and transport coefficients. However, key quantum phenomena, including uncertainty relations, arise precisely from the noncommutation of observables. How does this noncommutation affect thermodynamic behaviour?

The noncommutation of conserved charges has been shown to challenge standard assumptions: it can invalidate conventional derivations of the thermal state, increase entanglement, induce critical dynamics, alter entropy production, and conflict with the eigenstate thermalization hypothesis, among other effects.

A central open question remains: evidence suggests that noncommuting charges can both hinder and enhance thermalization, revealing a conceptual tension at the heart of this growing field.

== Engineered reservoirs ==
Nanoscale allows for the preparation of quantum systems in physical states without classical analogs. There, complex out-of-equilibrium scenarios may be produced by the initial preparation of either the working substance or the reservoirs of quantum particles, the latter dubbed as "engineered reservoirs".

There are different forms of engineered reservoirs. Some of them involve subtle quantum coherence or correlation effects, while others rely solely on nonthermal classical probability distribution functions. Interesting phenomena may emerge from the use of engineered reservoirs such as efficiencies greater than the Otto limit, violations of Clausius inequalities, or simultaneous extraction of heat and work from the reservoirs.

== See also ==
- Quantum statistical mechanics
- Thermal quantum field theory
