= Joseph Keenan =

Joseph Keenan may refer to:

- Joseph B. Keenan (1888–1954), politician
- Joseph D. Keenan (1896–1984), American labor union leader
- Joseph Henry Keenan (1900–1977), thermodynamicist
- Joe Keenan (footballer) (born 1982), English footballer
- Joe Keenan (writer) (born 1958), American screenwriter, producer and writer
