= George N. Hatsopoulos =

American mechanical engineer (1927–2018)

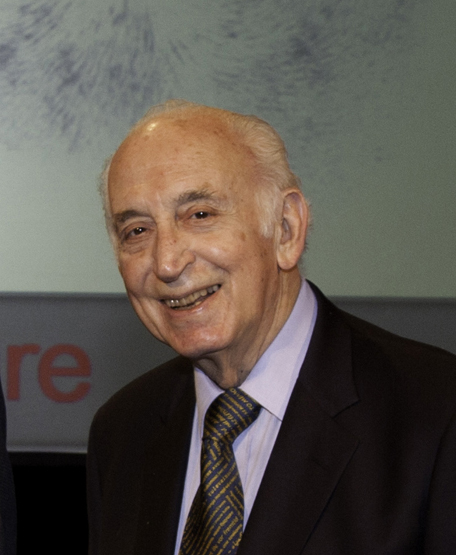
- Hatsopoulos in 2011
- Born: January 7, 1927; Athens, Greece
- Died: September 20, 2018 (aged 91); Lincoln, Massachusetts, U.S.
- Awards: John Fritz Medal (1996); US National Academy of Engineering (1978)
- Scientific career
- Fields: Mechanical engineering
- Workplaces: Massachusetts Institute of Technology

George Nicholas Hatsopoulos (January 7, 1927 – September 20, 2018) was a Greek American mechanical engineer noted for his work in thermodynamics and for having co-founded Thermo Electron.

== Early life ==
Hatsopoulos was born in Athens, Greece in 1927 and is related to the former rector of the Athens Polytechnic School, Nicolas Kitsikis. He attended Athens Polytechnic before entering MIT, where he received his Bachelor and Master of Science (1950), Mechanical Engineer (1954), and Doctorate of Science (1956).

== Hatsopoulos-Keenan reformulation of thermodynamics ==
In 1965, he and Joseph Keenan published their textbook Principles of General Thermodynamics, which restates the second law of thermodynamics in terms of the existence of stable equilibrium states. Their formulation of the second law of thermodynamics states that:

When an isolated system performs a process after the removal of a series of internal constraints, it will reach a unique state of stable equilibrium: this state of equilibrium is independent of the order in which the constraints are removed.

The Hatsopoulos-Keenan statement of the Second Law entails the Clausius, Kelvin-Planck, and Carathéodory statements of the Second Law, and has provided a basis to extend the traditional definition of entropy to the non-equilibrium domain. Hatsopoulos and Keenan maintained that it is unlikely to identify a satisfactory definition of heat without a prior statement of the second law.

Hatsopoulos helped pioneer academic work in quantum thermodynamics. In the Spring term of 1971 at MIT, he and Elias Gyftopoulos offered what is regarded as the first university course titled "Quantum Thermodynamics". It was a graduate-level class designated 2.47J. In 1976, he also contributed to the formulation of a unified theory of mechanics and thermodynamics, arguably a precursor of the emerging interconnected fields of nonequilibrium thermodynamics and quantum thermodynamics (see e.g. Refs.)

== Academic and industry leader ==
While at MIT, Hatsopoulos was head of the engineering division of Matrad Corporation of New York. Matrad Corporation and MIT also provided financial support for his doctoral thesis, The Thermo-Electron Engine. Matrad Corporation was owned by the family of Peter M. Nomikos, a Harvard Business School graduate. In 1956, Hatsopoulos founded the Thermo Electron Corporation with a founding investment by Peter Nomikos. Many years later, George asked his brother (John Hatsopoulos) to join the company as financial controller. Thermo Electron became a major provider of analytical instruments and services for a variety of domains. In 1965, George Hatsopoulos was president of the Thermo Electron Engineering Corporation and Senior Lecturer in Mechanical Engineering at M.I.T.

== Recognition ==
In 1961, Hatsopoulos received the Golden Plate Award of the American Academy of Achievement. Hatsopoulos was elected to the US National Academy of Engineering in 1978. In 1996, Hatsopoulos won the John Fritz Medal, which is the highest American award in the engineering profession and presented each year for scientific or industrial achievement in any field of pure or applied science. In 1997, he was awarded the 3rd Annual Heinz Award in Technology, the Economy and Employment.

In 2011, along with Arvin Smith and John Hatsopoulos, he was awarded the 2011 Pittcon Heritage Award from the Chemical Heritage Foundation.

Hatsopoulos is also a recipient of The International Center in New York's Award of Excellence.

He died on September 20, 2018, at the age of 91. His net worth was reported as US$481 million in 2017.

== See also ==
- History of thermodynamics
