= Isolated system =

Physical systems that don't interact with other parts of the universe

Properties of Isolated, closed, and open systems in exchanging energy and matter

In physical science, an isolated system is either of the following:

1. a physical system so far removed from other systems that it does not interact with them.
2. a thermodynamic system enclosed by rigid immovable walls through which neither mass nor energy can pass.

Though subject internally to its own gravity, an isolated system is usually taken to be outside the reach of external gravitational and other long-range forces.

This can be contrasted with what (in the more common terminology used in thermodynamics) is called a closed system, being enclosed by selective walls through which energy can pass as heat or work, but not matter; and with an open system, which both matter and energy can enter or exit, though it may have variously impermeable walls in parts of its boundaries.

An isolated system obeys the conservation law that its total energy–mass stays constant. Most often, in thermodynamics, mass and energy are treated as separately conserved.

Because of the requirement of enclosure, and the near ubiquity of gravity, strictly and ideally isolated systems do not actually occur in experiments or in nature. Though very useful, they are strictly hypothetical.

Classical thermodynamics is usually presented as postulating the existence of isolated systems. It is also usually presented as derived from experience. Obviously, no experience has been reported of an ideally isolated system.

It is, however, an empirical observation that some physical systems, including isolated ones, do seem to reach their own states of internal thermodynamic equilibrium. Classical thermodynamics postulates the existence of systems in their own states of internal thermodynamic equilibrium. This postulate is a very useful idealization.

In the attempt to explain the idea of a gradual approach to thermodynamic equilibrium after a thermodynamic operation, with entropy increasing according to the second law of thermodynamics, Boltzmann's H-theorem used equations, which assumed a system (for example, a gas) was isolated. That is, all the mechanical degrees of freedom could be specified, treating the enclosing walls simply as mirror boundary conditions. This led to Loschmidt's paradox. If, however, the stochastic behavior of the molecules and thermal radiation in real enclosing walls is considered, then the system is in effect in a heat bath. Then Boltzmann's assumption of molecular chaos can be justified.

The concept of an isolated system can serve as a useful model approximating many real-world situations. It is an acceptable idealization used in constructing mathematical models of certain natural phenomena; e.g., the planets in the Solar System, and the proton and electron in a hydrogen atom are often treated as isolated systems. But, from time to time, a hydrogen atom will interact with electromagnetic radiation and go to an excited state.

== Radiative isolation ==
For radiative isolation, the walls should be perfectly conductive, so as to perfectly reflect the radiation within the cavity, as for example imagined by Planck.

He was considering the internal thermal radiative equilibrium of a thermodynamic system in a cavity initially devoid of substance. He did not mention what he imagined to surround his perfectly reflective and thus perfectly conductive walls. Presumably, since they are perfectly reflective, they isolate the cavity from any external electromagnetic effect. Planck held that for radiative equilibrium within the isolated cavity, it needed to have added to its interior a speck of carbon.

If the cavity with perfectly reflective walls contains enough radiative energy to sustain a temperature of cosmological magnitude, then the speck of carbon is not needed because the radiation generates particles of substance, such as for example electron-positron pairs, and thereby reaches thermodynamic equilibrium.

A different approach is taken by Roger Balian. For quantizing the radiation in the cavity, he imagines his radiatively isolating walls to be perfectly conductive. Though he does not mention mass outside, and it seems from his context that he intends the reader to suppose the interior of the cavity to be devoid of mass, he does imagine that some factor causes currents in the walls. If that factor is internal to the cavity, it can be only the radiation, which would thereby be perfectly reflected. For the thermal equilibrium problem, however, he considers walls that contain charged particles that interact with the radiation inside the cavity; such cavities are of course not isolated, but may be regarded as in a heat bath.

== See also ==
- Closed system
- Dynamical system
- Open system
- Thermodynamic system
- Open system (thermodynamics)
