= Elias Gyftopoulos =

Greek-American thermodynamicist

Elias Panayiotis
- Born: 4 July 1927; Athens, Greece
- Died: 23 June 2012 (aged 84); Lincoln, Massachusetts, United States
- Citizenship: Greece; United States (from 1963)
- Education: National Technical University of Athens; Massachusetts Institute of Technology
- Awards: ASME Thurston Lecture Award (2002); US National Academy of Engineering
- Scientific career
- Fields: Thermodynamics; Energetics; Physics
- Workplaces: Massachusetts Institute of Technology

Elias Panayiotis Gyftopoulos (Greek: Ηλίας Παναγιώτης Γυφτόπουλος; July 4, 1927 – June 23, 2012) was a Greek-American engineer who contributed to thermodynamics both in its general formulation and its quantum foundations.

Gyftopoulos received an undergraduate degree in mechanical and electrical engineering in 1953 at the National Technical University of Athens, and a Doctor of Science degree in electrical engineering at the Massachusetts Institute of Technology in 1958. At MIT, he initially focused on nuclear reactor safety and control. After meeting professors George N. Hatsopoulos and Joseph H. Keenan, his interests moved towards thermodynamics, in an attempt to give a consistent and rigorous exposition, free of the logical flaws and the limitations commonly associated with this discipline: his contribution culminated with reference textbook which completely reformulates the foundations of the subject, offering a general non-statistical definition of entropy applicable to both macroscopic and microscopic systems, both in equilibrium and in non-equilibrium states, and providing strong background and deep understanding of many applications in energy engineering for modern graduate curricula. His research also pioneered the subject of quantum thermodynamics with an early effort to give a quantum basis to thermodynamics by means a physical theory unifying mechanics and thermodynamics.

Throughout his career, his work broadly recognized with the highest honors in the field, including the American Society of Mechanical Engineers' Robert Henry Thurston Lecture Award and election to the US National Academy of Engineering.

== Works ==
- Gyftopoulos, E. P.; Beretta, G. P. (2005) [1st ed., Macmillan, 1991]. Thermodynamics: Foundations and Applications. Mineola (New York): Dover Publications. ISBN 978-0-486-13518-2. ISBN 9780486439327
- Elias P. Gyftopoulos complete collection of published scientific works
