= Joseph Henry Keenan =

American thermodynamicist (1900–1977)

- Born: August 24, 1900; Wilkes-Barre, Pennsylvania, U.S.
- Died: July 17, 1977 (aged 76)
- Education: Massachusetts Institute of Technology
- Known for: Steam tables, textbooks
- Awards: Fellow, American Academy of Arts and Sciences (1937); ASME Worcester Reed Warner Medal (1954); Honorary Member, ASME (1966); National Academy of Engineering (1976)
- Scientific career
- Fields: Thermodynamics, thermal power systems
- Workplaces: Stevens Institute of Technology, Massachusetts Institute of Technology
- Notable students: Ascher H. Shapiro, G. N. Hatsopoulos

Joseph Henry Keenan (August 24, 1900 – July 17, 1977) was an American thermodynamicist and mechanical engineer known for his development of the steam tables, his research on jet and rocket propulsion, and his contributions to the understanding of the laws of thermodynamics in the mid-20th century.

Keenan was a professor of mechanical engineering at the Massachusetts Institute of Technology, an honorary member of the American Society of Mechanical Engineers, and a member of the U.S. National Academy of Engineering.

His 1941 textbook Thermodynamics was widely used in engineering curricula during the 1940s and 1950s. This book emphasized the concept of thermodynamic availability, which laid the groundwork for later development of thermodynamic exergy.

== Education and career ==
Keenan earned a bachelor's degree in naval architecture and marine engineering at the Massachusetts Institute of Technology (MIT) in 1922. After working as a design engineer on steam turbines for General Electric, Keenan became an assistant professor of mechanical engineering at the Stevens Institute of Technology in 1928. In 1934, he became an associate professor of mechanical engineering at MIT. He was promoted to professor in 1939. He served as Head of the Department of Mechanical Engineering at MIT from 1958 to 1961.

A major portion of Keenan's career was devoted to the development of accurate tables of the properties of steam, which are important to the electric power industry. In 1929, he was appointed the U.S. delegate to the First International Conference on the Properties of Steam; he served as delegate to all subsequent conferences on this subject through the eighth, in 1974.

In 1965, he published the textbook Principles of General Thermodynamics with George Hatsopoulos. They framed the second law of thermodynamics in terms of the existence of stable equilibrium states:

When an isolated system performs a process after the removal of a series of internal constraints, it will reach a unique state of stable equilibrium: this state of equilibrium is independent of the order in which the constraints are removed.

The Hatsopoulos-Keenan statement of the second law was later used to formulate a general axiomatic description of classical, statistical, and quantum thermodynamics in equilibrium and nonequilibrium states by Hatsopoulos, E. P. Gyftopoulos, E. Zanchini, and G. P. Beretta.

== Honors ==
Keenan was elected a fellow of the American Academy of Arts and Sciences in 1937. He received the ASME Worcester Reed Warner Medal in 1954 for his work on thermodynamics and the properties of steam. He was elected an honorary member of the American Society of Mechanical Engineers in 1966, and he was elected to the National Academy of Engineering in 1976, for "contributions to engineering thermodynamics and engineering education".

In 2007, an International Thermodynamics Symposium called Meeting the Entropy Challenge was held at MIT in memory of Keenan.

== See also ==
- History of thermodynamics
