= Hopper cooling =

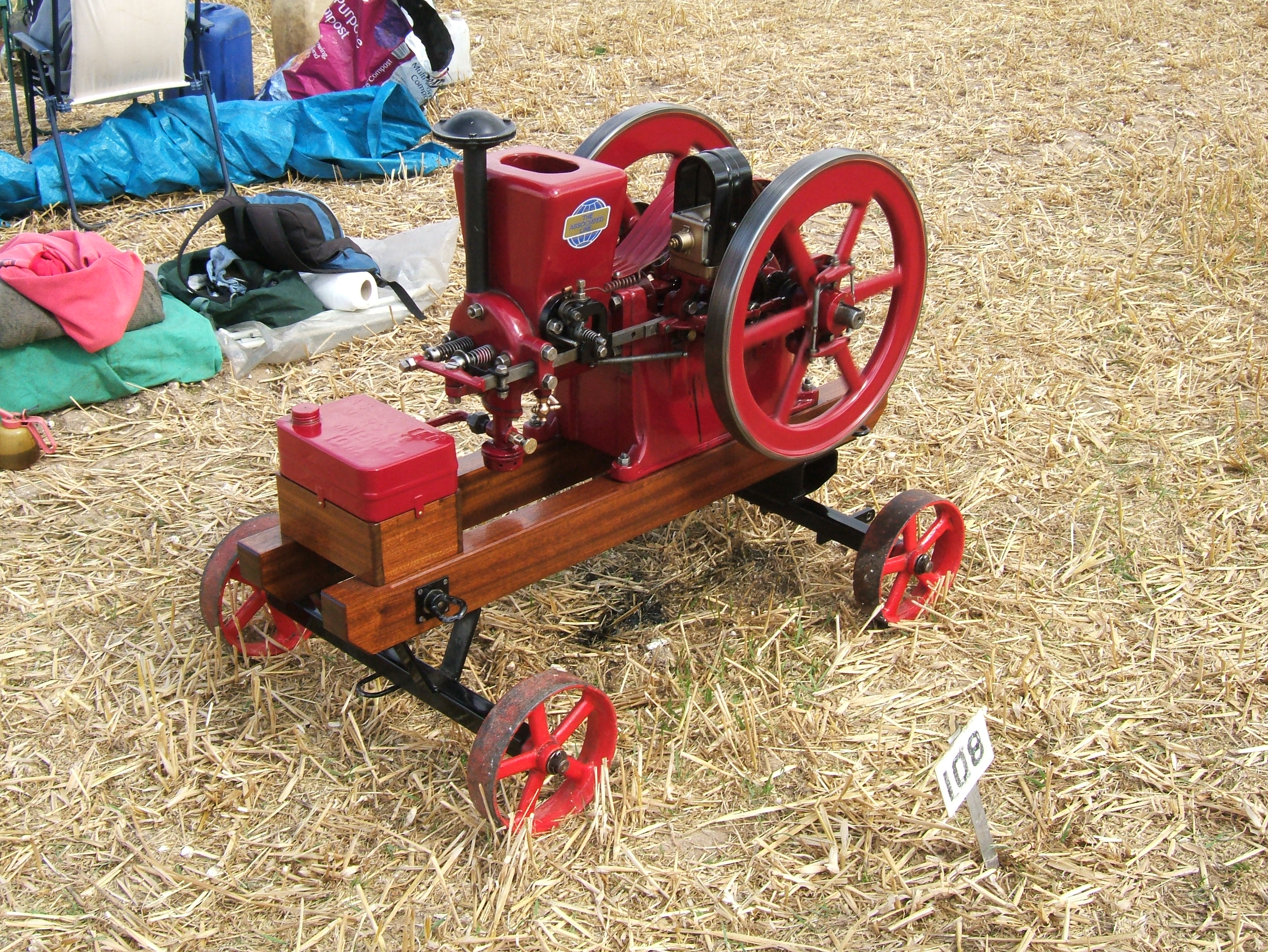
Amanco 'Hired Man' engine The hopper is the open-topped iron vessel in the centre on top

Hopper cooling is a simple form of water cooling used for small stationary engines. The defining feature of hopper cooling, amongst other water-cooled engines, is that there is no radiator. Cooling water is heated by the engine and evaporates from the surface of the hopper as steam.

== Operation ==
Internal combustion engines are rather inefficient and require cooling to dispose of the waste heat they generate when running. Water-cooled engines remove this heat from around the cylinder head by surrounding it with a water jacket.

In most familiar engines today, this water is circulated from the hot parts of the engine to a radiator, where it gives up its heat to the air.

In early and low powered engines with hopper cooling there is little circulation. Water is instead slowly boiled off, with the heat of vaporisation needed to boil the water coming from the engine heat. The loss of heat with this departing water vapour is enough to cool the engine.

As the heat of vaporisation (energy needed to vaporise water) is much larger than the specific heat capacity (energy to raise the temperature of water by one degree), relatively little water is required to replace that lost by evaporation. The heat needed to boil water is equivalent to a 540 °C rise in temperature, or about 7 times that needed to raise the temperature of the water from ambient to boiling.

Specific heat capacity	c_{P}	4.1813 J·g^{−1}·K^{−1}
Heat of vaporisation		2260 J·g^{−1}

$\frac{( 2260 \text{J}\text{g}^{-1} / 4.1813 \text{J}\text{g}^{-1}\text{K}^{-1} ) } { (100\text{°C} - 20\text{°C} )} \approx 7$

A typical small engine would consume a few bucketfuls in a working day.

Although hopper cooling is inefficient, in terms of the amount of heat removed for the size of the water jacket, it does maintain the cylinder temperature at a low temperature. Provided that the hopper does not boil dry, the temperature cannot exceed the 100°C atmospheric boiling point of water. This is both an advantage and a disadvantage: it maintains a low operating temperature, helping to preserve the fragile piston rings and exhaust valves of these early engines. However it also limits efficiency of operation, as the engine cannot run at a higher and more efficient operating temperature.

Large engines would use thermosyphon cooling. The hopper on the engine would be supplemented by a large drum of water above the engine. This would give some circulation between the two, but as there was no large surface area for heat transfer to the air, as with a radiator, the eventual cooling would still largely be by evaporation.

== Applications ==
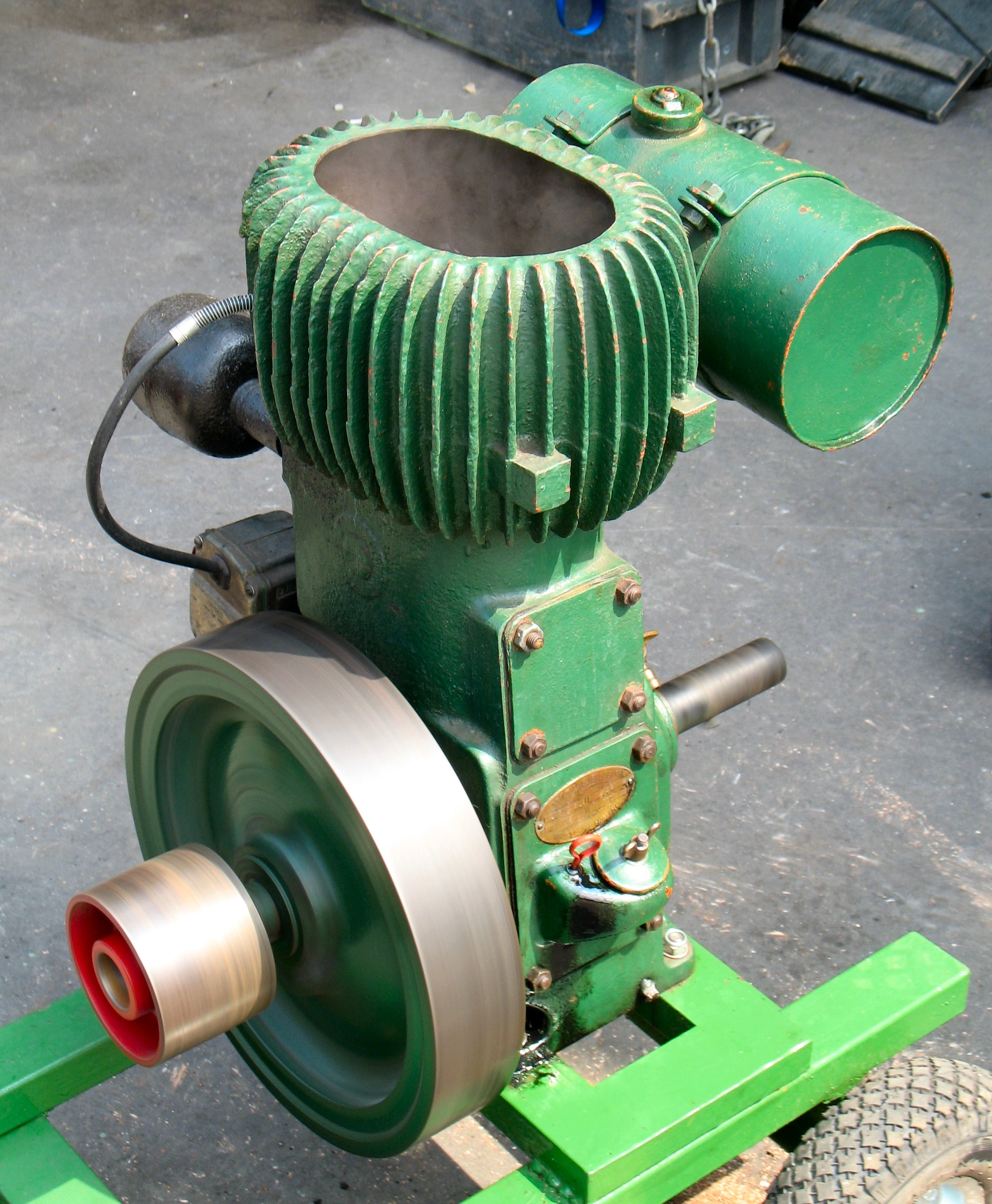
Wolseley WD engine, with finned hopper

Hopper-cooled engines are usually single cylinder, and usually petrol engines rather than diesel. These are the engines that appeared in great numbers between the wars, driving a range of farm machinery by flat belt drives. These engines were used intermittently, and usually with an operator in attendance.

To avoid frost damage, the hopper could be drained easily through a large brass tap. This would be done regularly, sometimes after every use, to avoid rust inside the hopper. As the cooling water evaporated continuously when running, no anti-freeze or anti-corrosion additives were used.

== Obsolescence ==
Hopper cooling has now largely disappeared. Lighter and more efficient engines were developed post-WWII, using air cooling. These were developed from motorcycle engines and made use of developments in aluminium casting to make thin-walled cylinder blocks with cast-in cooling fins. These are simpler in operation and do not require water, level checking or anti-freeze.

A handful of engines, now largely diesels, retained hopper cooling into the 21st century. These were simply constructed engines, still using cast-iron blocks to provide more strength from a crude foundry, as a diesel engine required more strength than unsophisticated aluminium castings could provide. Single cylinder horizontal diesel engines were built in India and China and were briefly imported to the West around 2000, but were outlawed by emission control regulations.

== Hot-air engines ==
Large hot air engines, such as the Rider-Ericsson, also used hopper cooling.

== Evaporative cooling ==
Evaporative or steam cooling was used experimentally for high-powered aircraft engines in the 1930s, notably the Rolls-Royce Goshawk. Although both systems rely on evaporation, they are quite different. Aircraft evaporative cooling, like radiator systems, used a pumped closed-loop for the coolant, without loss. The coolant vapour was captured in radiators, or in this case condensers and re-circulated.
