= Return stroke (disambiguation) =

Return stroke is the most luminous and noticeable part of the lightning discharge.

Return stroke may also refer to:

- Return stroke, a type of shot in tennis
- Return stroke in swimming
- Return stroke of a four-bar linkage
- Return stroke of a shaper
- Return stroke of a vacuum engine
