= Manson engine =

Hot air engine

Animation

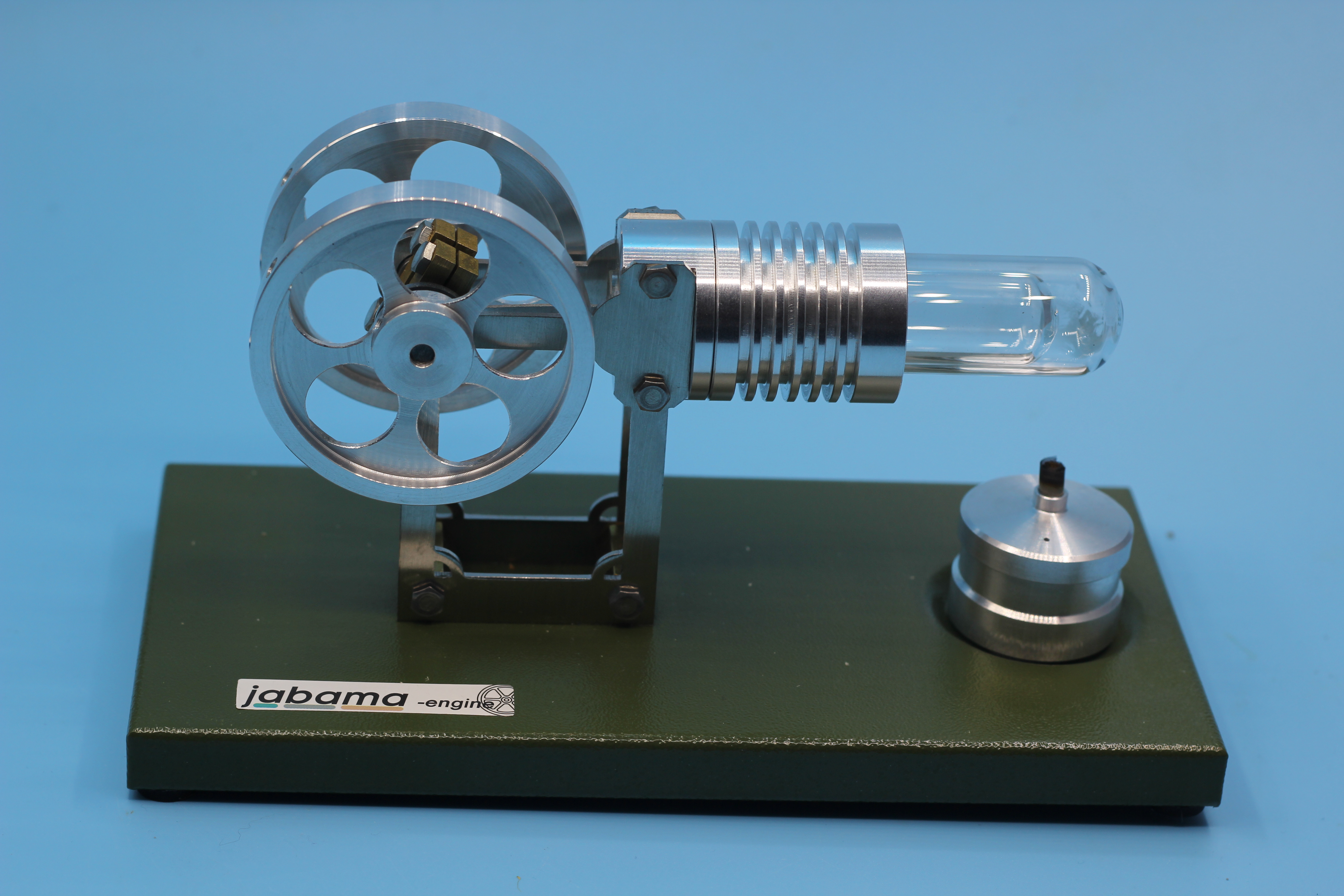
Photo

The Manson engine is a hot air engine that was first described by A. D. Manson in the March 1952 issue of Newnes Practical Mechanics-Magazines. Manson engines can be started in either direction (clockwise or anti-clockwise). It has a stepped piston. The front part acts as a displacer and the back part acts as a work piston (the displacer and the work piston move as a single component). The engine only requires three moving parts: piston, piston rod, and crank.

The engine is double acting, using both the expansion of the warmed air and atmospheric pressure overcoming the reducing pressure of the cooling air to do work.

The engine currently has no commercial or practical applications. The engines are built mainly as desk toys, physics demonstrations, and novelties.

== Functioning mechanism ==
Drawing based on the original design

ideal PV-Diagramm

- Phase 1 (cooling down the work medium, suction stroke)
  - when the Piston is moved toward the heat source, the hot gas inside the engine is moved to the cool side of the cylinder.
  - the gas is cooled there, resulting in pressure dropping below atmospheric, further moving the piston toward the heat source.
- Phase 2 (top dead centre)
  - When the piston reaches top dead centre, the inlet valve is open, releasing the vacuum.
  - the flywheel keeps the piston moving
- Phase 3 (heating up the work medium, expansion stroke)
  - when the piston is moving away from the heat source, the air is pushed toward the heat source.
  - the air is then heating up, resulting in the air expanding and the piston being further pushed away from the heat source
- Phase 4 (bottom dead centre)
  - when the piston reaches bottom dead centre, the exhaust valve is open, releasing the build up pressure and hot air.
  - the flywheel keeps the piston moving

== Differences from Stirling engines ==
Stirling engines are typically closed systems, while Manson engines are open systems. The displacer and work piston of the Manson engine have zero phase angle. Unlike many Stirling engines, Manson engines generally do not get very hot during operation as a result of the intrinsic cooling effect of taking in cold air and releasing hot air in every cyle.

== Variations ==
Manson-Ruppel-Engine

- Manson-Guise Engine

The valves and gas paths are considered by some to be complicated to manufacture, so various variants exist with improved, modified, or simplified valves and gas paths.
