= Amontons (crater) =

Crater on the Moon

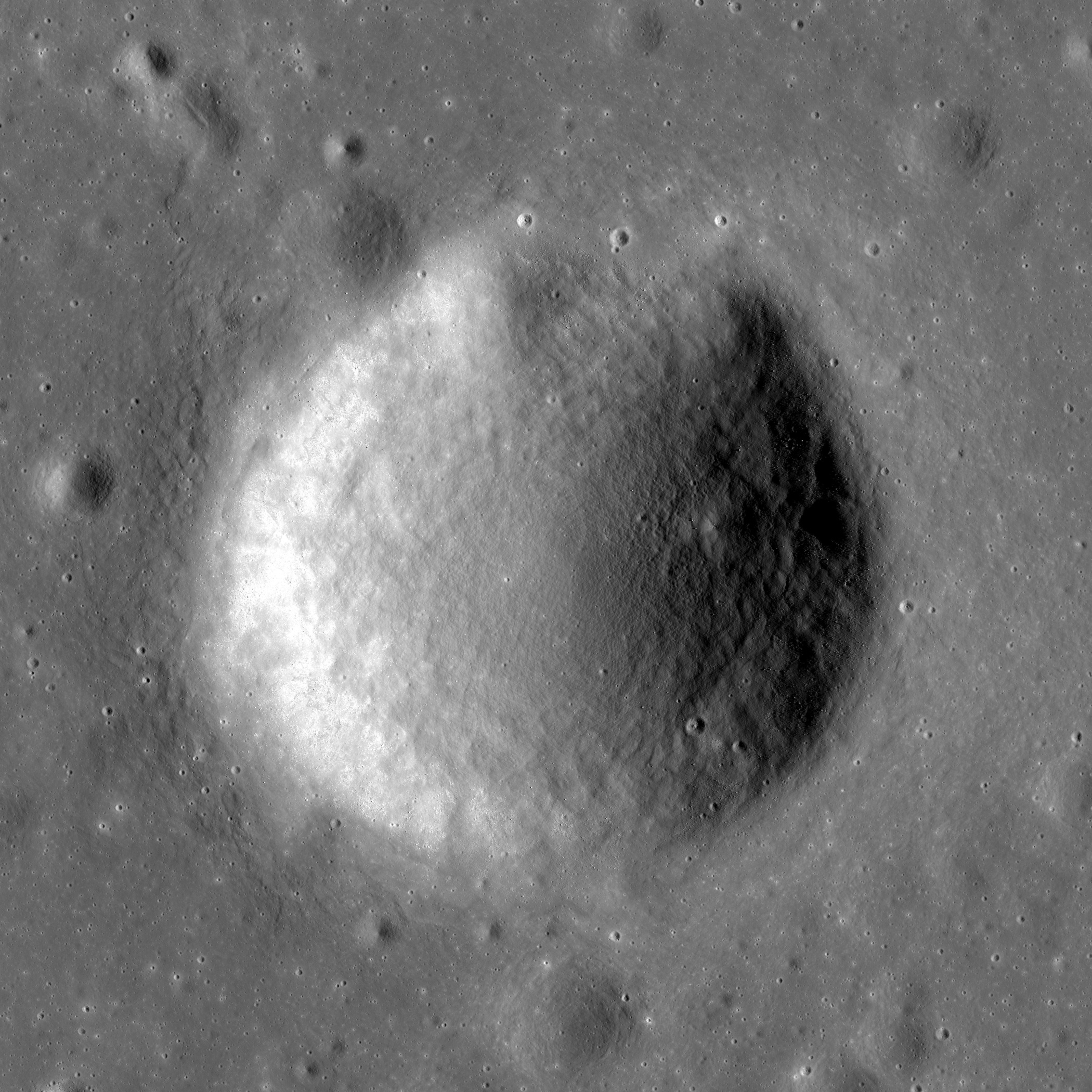
- Photo by LRO
- Coordinates: 5.3°S 46.8°E
- Diameter: 2.47 km (1.53 mi)
- Depth: Unknown
- Colongitude: 213° at sunrise
- Eponym: Guillaume Amontons

Amontons is a tiny lunar impact crater in the western half of the Mare Fecunditatis. It is a circular, cup-shaped formation that has been excavated out of the level surface by the impact, and is the same dark hue as the surrounding mare. When the sun is at a low angle, multiple ghost-craters are visible in the mare surface to the south-southeast and north of it.

This crater is named after French physicist Guillaume Amontons (1663-1705). Its designation was formally adopted by the International Astronomical Union in 1976. It was previously named Messier DB, a satellite of Messier crater.
