= Guillaume Amontons =

French scientific instrument inventor and physicist (1663-1705)

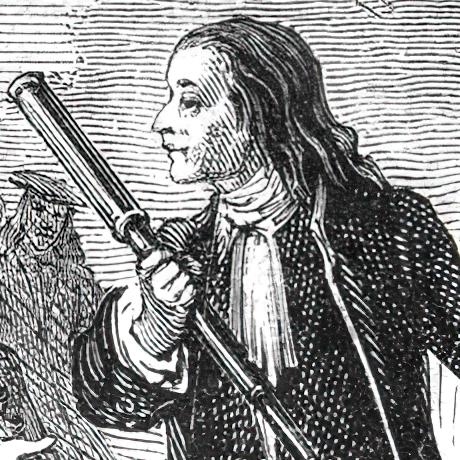
- Born: 31 August 1663; Paris, France
- Died: 11 October 1705 (aged 42); Paris, France
- Known for: Amontons' laws Hot air engine Thermodynamic temperature
- Scientific career
- Fields: Physics

Guillaume Amontons (31 August 1663 – 11 October 1705) was a French scientific instrument inventor and physicist. He was one of the pioneers in studying the problem of friction, which is the resistance to motion when bodies make contact. He is also known for his work on thermodynamics, the concept of absolute zero, and early engine design.

== Life ==
Guillaume was born in Paris, France. His father was a lawyer from Normandy who had moved to the French capital. While still young, Guillaume lost his hearing and became mostly deaf. According to one biographer, Fontenelle, while studying perpetual motion, he became convinced of the importance of studying machines from a mathematical perspective. He never attended a university, but was able to study mathematics, the physical sciences, and celestial mechanics. He also spent time studying the skills of drawing, surveying, and architecture. He died in Paris, France.

== Work ==
He was supported in his research career by the government, and was employed in various public works projects.

=== Scientific instruments ===
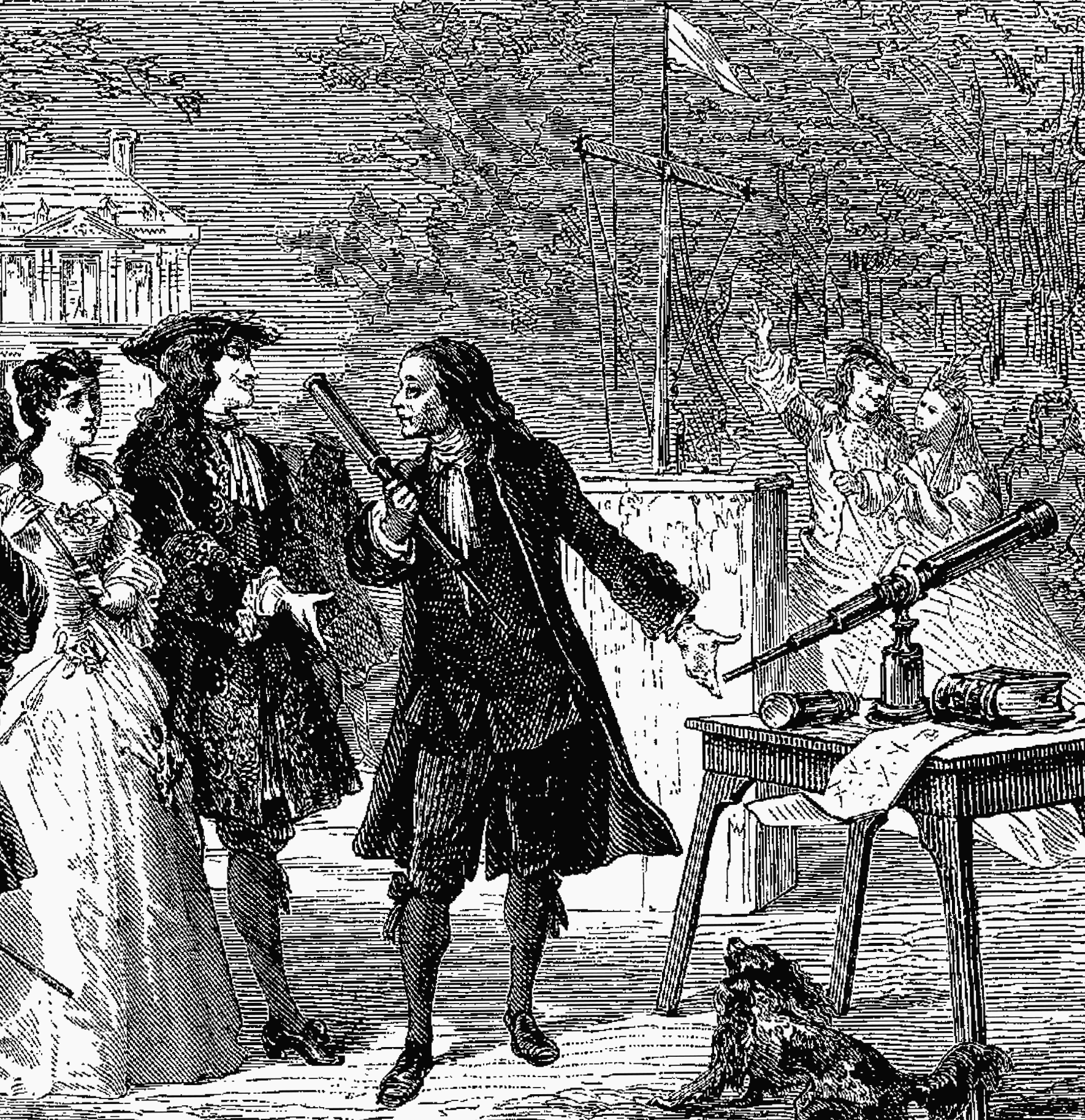
Amontons demonstrating his optical telegraph in the Luxembourg Gardens in 1690

Among his contributions to scientific instrumentation were improvements to the barometer (1695), hygrometer (1687), and thermometer (1695), particularly for use of these instruments at sea. He also demonstrated an optical telegraph and proposed the use of his clepsydra (water clock) for keeping time on a ship at sea.

=== Thermodynamics ===
Amontons investigated the relationship between pressure and temperature in gases though he lacked accurate and precise thermometers. Though his results were at best semi-quantitative, he established that the pressure of a gas increases by roughly one-third between the temperatures of cold and the boiling point of water. This was a substantial step towards the subsequent gas laws and, in particular, Gay-Lussac's law. His work led him to speculate that a sufficient reduction in temperature would lead to the disappearance of pressure. Though he came close to finding absolute zero—the theoretical temperature by which the volume of air in his air-thermometer will be reduced to nothing (estimated by him as −240° on the Celsius scale), the discovery would not be complete until at least a century later.

Guillaume Amontons is also the inventor of the hot air engine. In 1699, he built his first engine, more than a century earlier than the well-known Stirling engine. This engine, named by Amontons a "fire mill" (moulin à feu) followed a new thermodynamic cycle, which later became known as the Stirling cycle.

The fire mill is a wheel that makes use of the expansion of heated air to generate motive power. The calculated power of Amontons' fire mill was 39 HP, equal to the power of the most powerful hot air engines of the 19th century (with the exception of the "caloric engine" of Ericsson). The main difference between Amontons' engine and the hot air engines of the 19th century was the nature of the piston (Amontons used water) and the use of rotational motion instead of alternating motion.

=== Friction ===
Free-body diagram for a block on a ramp. Arrows are vectors indicating directions and magnitudes of forces. N is the normal force, mg is the force of gravity, and F_{f} is the force of friction.

In 1699, Amontons published his rediscovery of the laws of friction first put forward by Leonardo da Vinci. Though they were received with some skepticism, the laws were verified by Charles-Augustin de Coulomb in 1781. For this contribution, Amontons was named as one of the 23 "Men of Tribology" by Duncan Dowson.

== Amontons' laws of friction ==
Amontons-Coulomb laws of friction:

1. The force of friction is directly proportional to the applied load. (Amontons' 1st law)
2. The force of friction is independent of the apparent area of contact. (Amontons' 2nd law)
3. Kinetic friction is independent of the sliding velocity. (Coulomb's law)

The first and second laws, which were founded by Amontons, and the third law, which was founded by Coulomb later, are called the Amontons-Coulomb laws of friction. (These three laws only apply to dry friction; the addition of a lubricant modifies the tribological properties significantly.)

The laws are shown by the classic example of a brick resting on an inclined plane, where it is in equilibrium and thus motionless. The force of gravity is opposed by static friction and as the angle of tilt of the plane is increased, the brick will eventually start to move downwards as gravity overcomes the frictional resistance.

Coulomb later found deviations from Amontons' laws in some cases. In systems with significant non-uniformity of the stress field, because local slip occurs before the entire system slides, Amontons' laws are not satisfied macroscopically.

== Honours ==
- Member, Académie des Sciences (1690)
- The crater Amontons on the Moon is named after him.

== See also ==
- Newton's laws of motion
