= Railway turntable =

Device for turning railway rolling stock

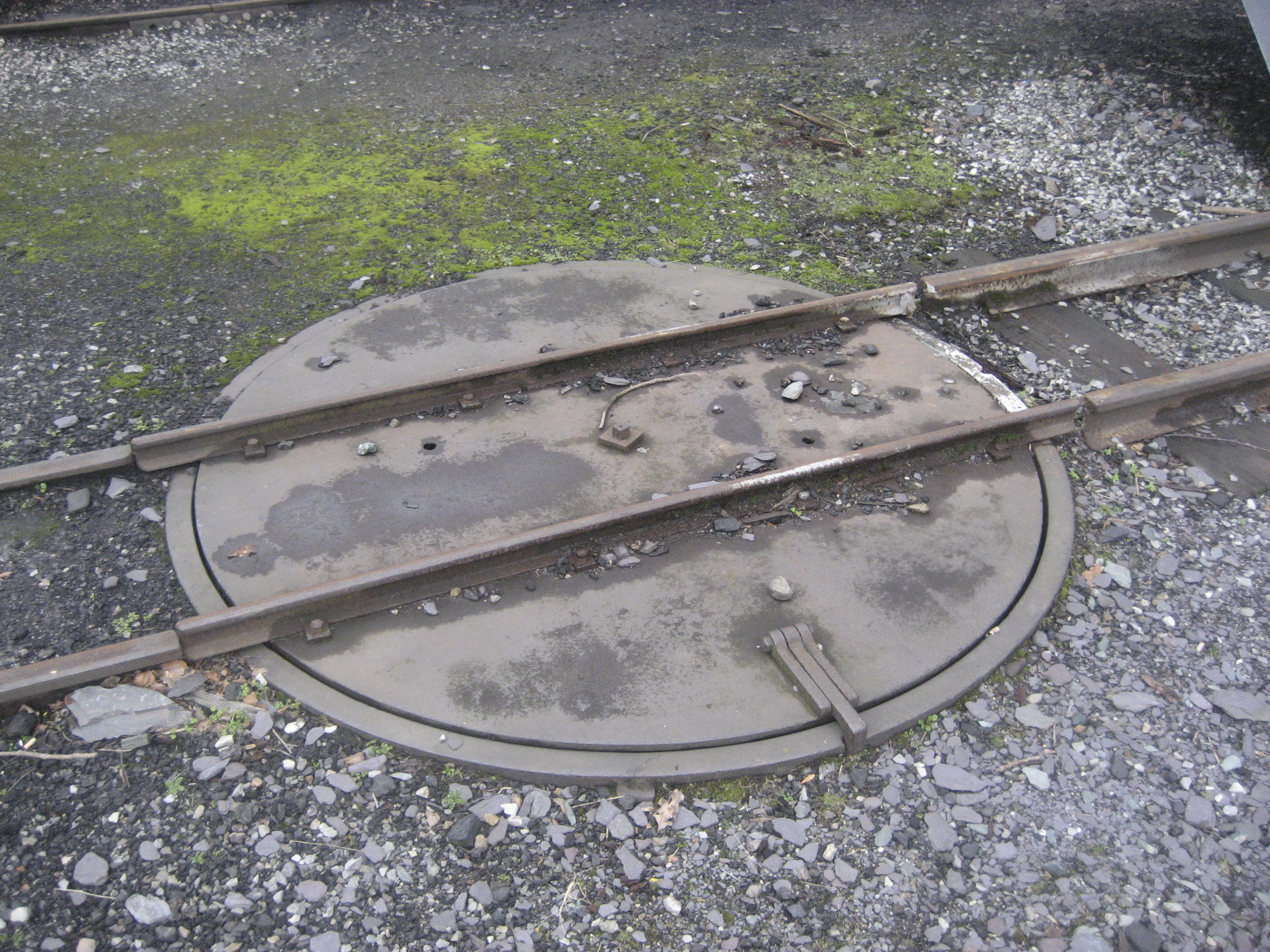
Wagon turntable at the National Slate Museum in Wales on 2 ft (610 mm) gauge track

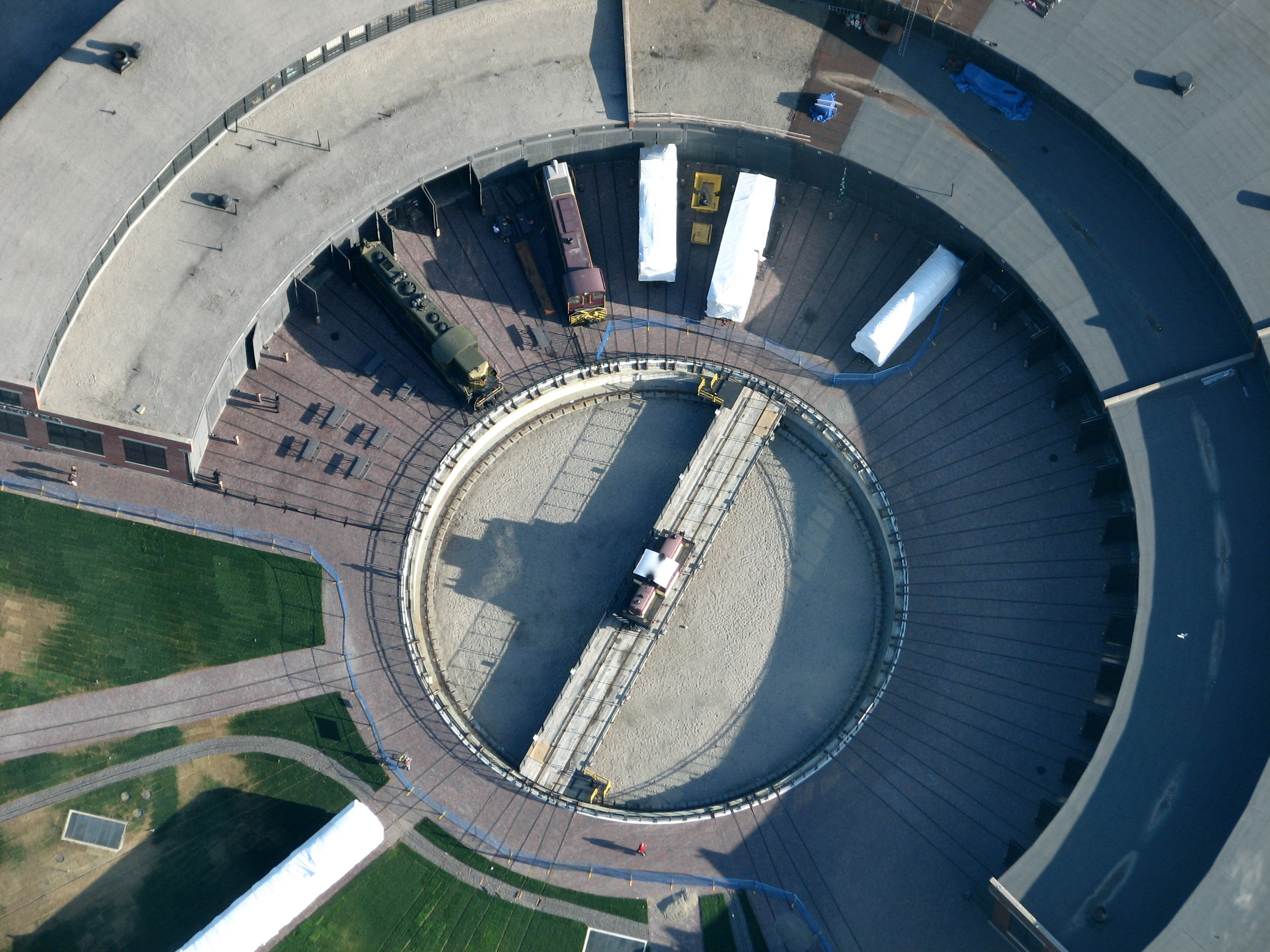
A turntable at the John Street Roundhouse, now part of Roundhouse Park in Toronto, Canada, viewed from the CN Tower in September 2012.

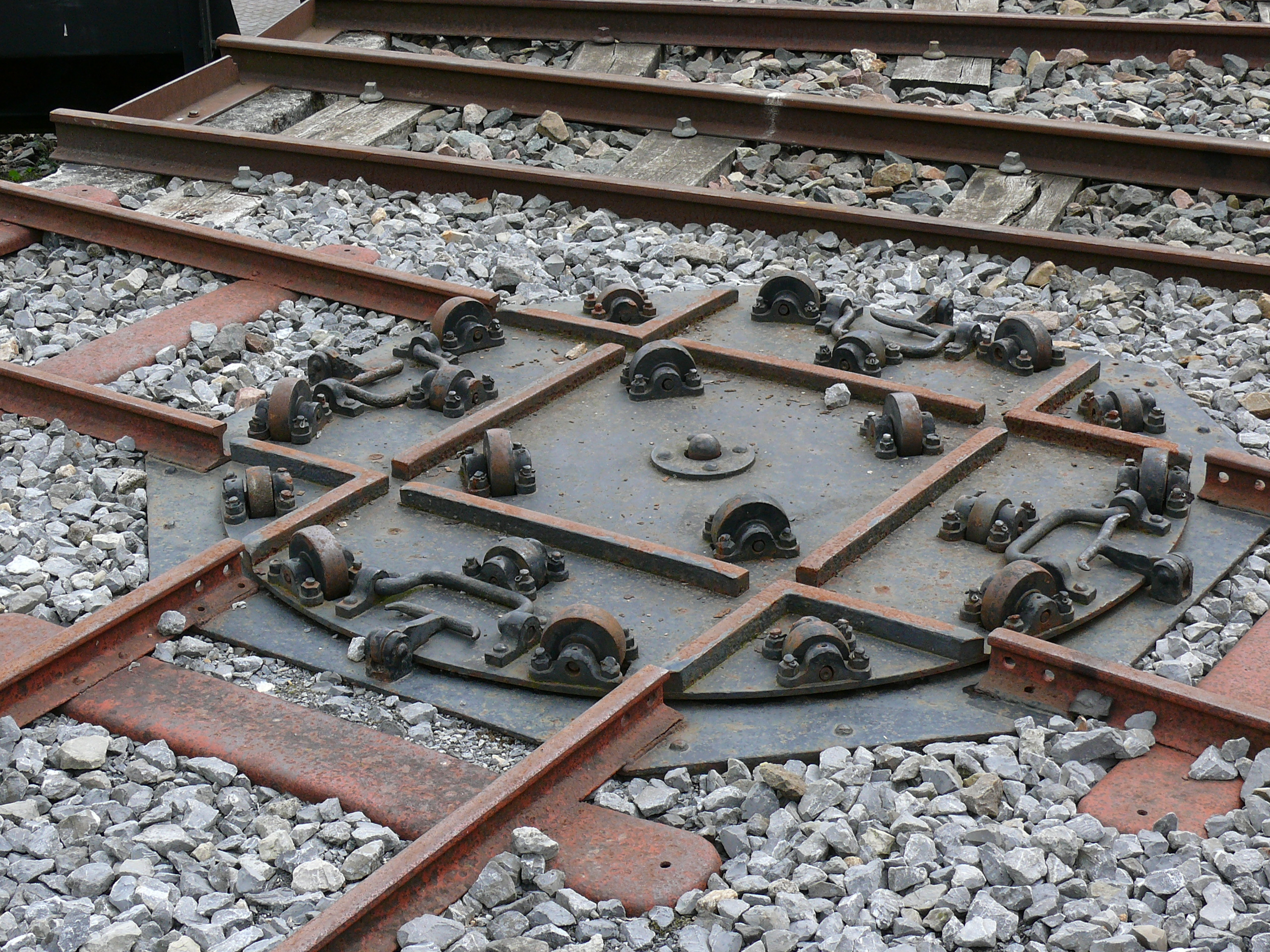
Trench railway turntable.

A railway turntable or wheelhouse is a rotating platform for turning railway rolling stock, usually locomotives, to face a different direction. It is especially used in areas where economic considerations or a lack of sufficient space have served to weigh against the construction of a turnaround wye. Railways needed a way to turn steam locomotives around for return journeys, as their controls were often not configured for extended periods of running in reverse; also many locomotives had a lower top speed in reverse. Most diesel locomotives, however, can be operated in either direction, and are considered to have "front ends" and "rear ends" (often determined by reference to the location of the crew cab). When a diesel locomotive is operated as a single unit, the railway company often prefers, or requires, that it be run "front end" first. When operated as part of a multiple unit locomotive consist, the locomotives can be arranged so that the consist can be operated "front end first" no matter which direction the consist is pointed. Turntables were also used to turn observation cars so that their windowed lounge ends faced toward the rear of the train.

Some early turntables rapidly became too small for their purpose as longer locomotives were introduced.

== History ==
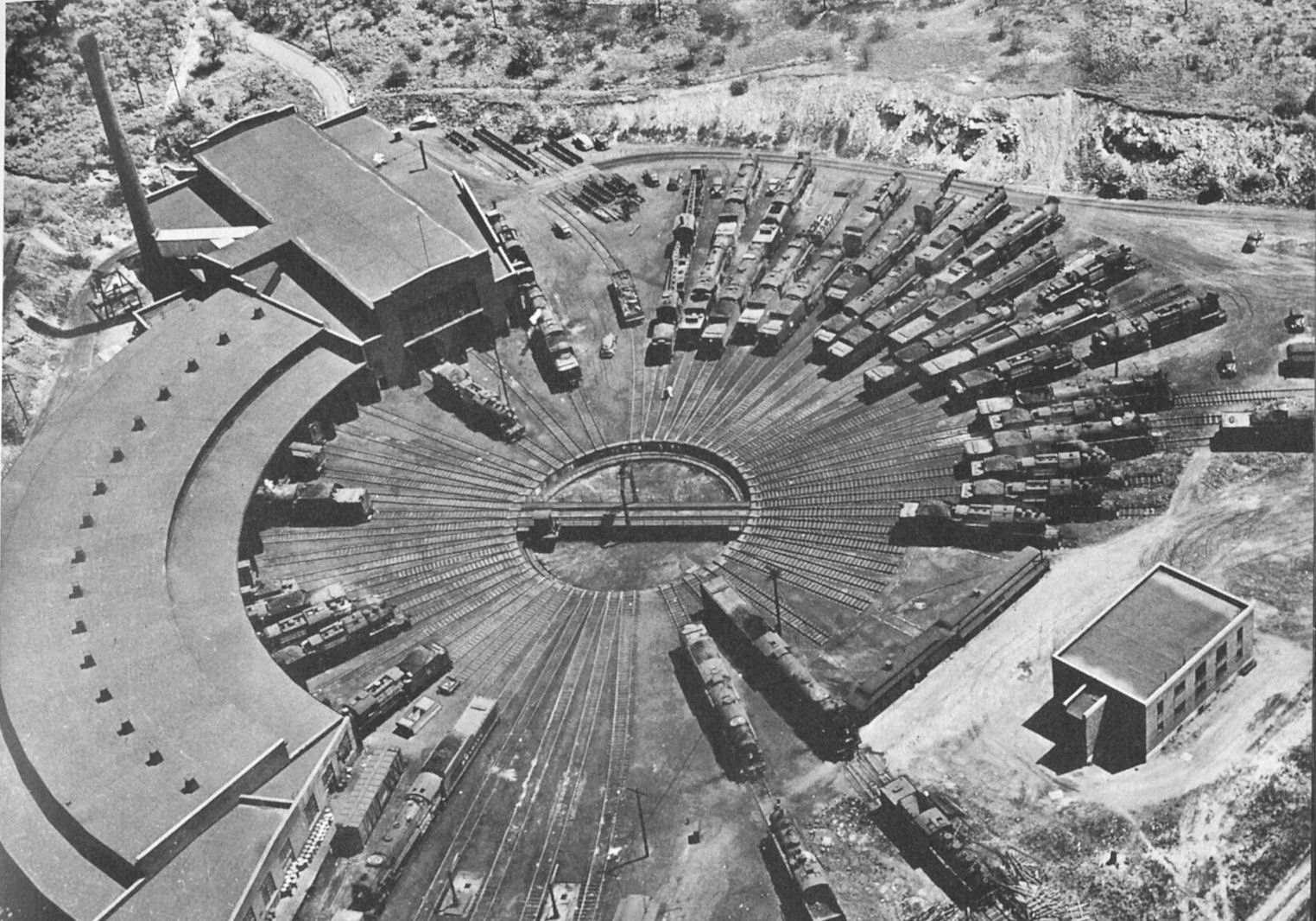
A turntable for the Central Railroad of New Jersey.

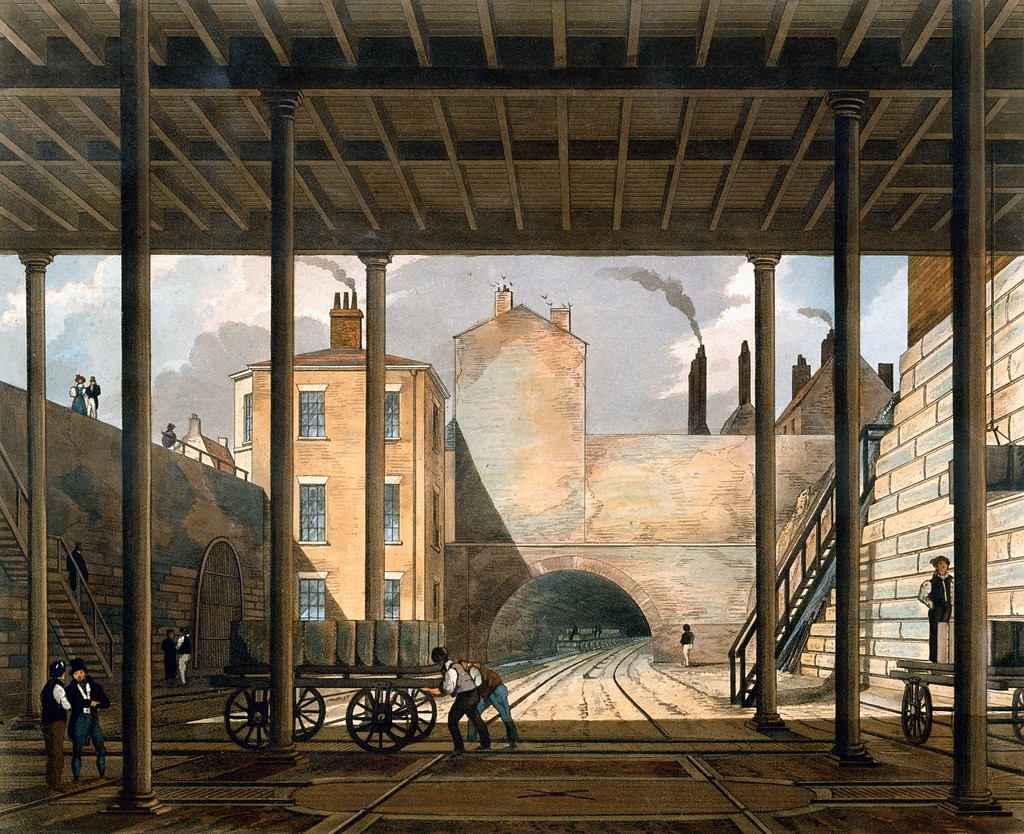
Turnplates at the Park Lane goods station of the Liverpool and Manchester Railway in 1831

Early wagonways were industrial railways for transporting goods—initially bulky and heavy items, particularly mined stone, ores and coal—from one point to another, most often to a dockside to be loaded onto ships. These early wagonways used a single point-to-point track, and when operators had to move a truck to another wagonway, they did so by hand. The lack of switching technology seriously limited the weight of any loaded wagon combination.

The first railway switches were in fact wagon turnplates or sliding rails. Turnplates were initially made of two or four pieces of wood, circular in form, that replicated the track running through them. Their diameter matched that of the wagons used on any given wagonway, and they swung around a central pivot. Loaded wagons could be moved onto the turnplate, and rotating the turnplate 90 degrees allowed the loaded wagon to be moved to another piece of wagonway. Thus, wagon weight was limited only by the strength of the wood used in the turnplates or sliding rails. When iron and later steel replaced stone and wood, weight capacity rose again.

However, the problems with turnplates and sliding rails were twofold. First, they were relatively small (often no more than 1 yard (0.91 m) in length), which limited the wagon length that could be turned. Second, their switching capacity could only be accessed when the wagon was on top of them and still, which limited the total capacity of any wagonway. The railway switch, which overcame both of these problems, was patented by Charles Fox in 1832.

As steam locomotives replaced horses as the preferred means of power, they became optimised to run in only one direction for operational ease and to provide some weather protection. The resulting need to turn heavy locomotives required an engineering upgrade to the existing turnplate technology. Like earlier turnplates, most new turntables consisted of a circular pit in which a steel bridge rotated. The bridge was typically supported and balanced by the central pivot, to reduce the total load on the pivot and to allow easy turning. This was most often achieved by a steel rail running around the floor of the pit that supported the ends of the bridge when a locomotive entered or exited. The turntables had a positive locking mechanism to prevent undesired rotation and to align the bridge rails with the exit track. Rotation of the bridge could be accomplished manually (either by brute force or with a windlass system), popularly called an "Armstrong" turntable, by an external power source, or by the braking system of the locomotive itself, though this required a locomotive to be on the table for it to be rotated.

The turntable bridge (the part of the turntable that included the tracks and that swivelled to turn the equipment) could span from 6 to 120 feet (1.8 to 36.6 m), depending on the railway's needs. Larger turntables were installed in maintenance facilities for longer locomotives, while short line and narrow gauge railways typically used smaller turntables. Turntables as small as 6 feet (1.83 m) in diameter have been installed in some industrial facilities where pieces of equipment are small enough to be pushed one at a time by humans or horsepower.

Some turntables that were built in earlier days rapidly became unsuitable for the longer locomotives introduced. The Roundhouse in London was built in 1846 to turn around steam locomotives on the line to Birmingham, but newer locomotives were too long within ten years—the building has been preserved and used for other purposes over the years.

== Roundhouse ==
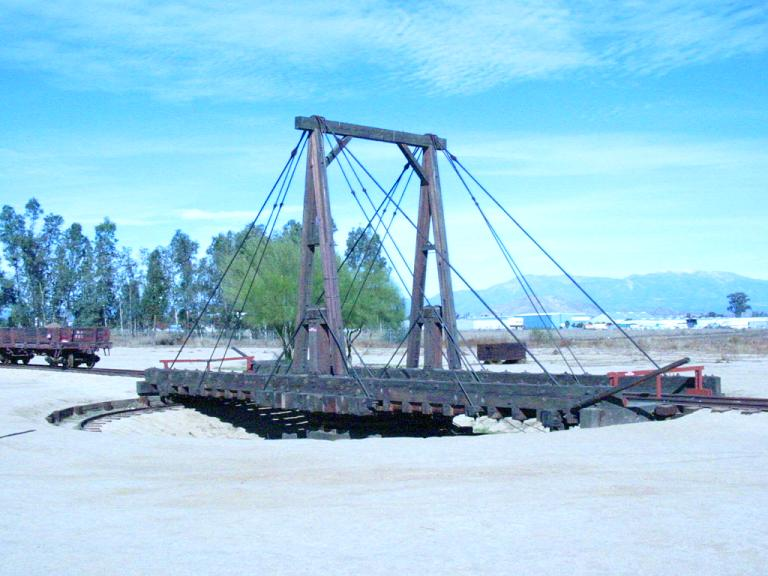
A small turntable at the Orange Empire Railway Museum in Perris, California, US. This type of turntable with the central tower and supporting cables is called a "gallows turntable"

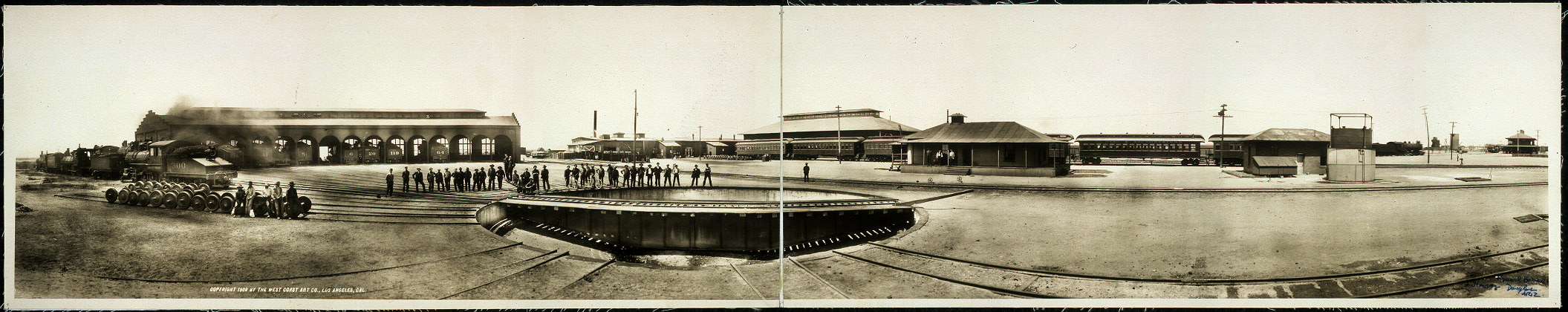
A larger turntable with several exits, 1909

In engine maintenance facilities, a turntable was usually surrounded, in part or in whole, by a building known as a roundhouse. It was more common for the roundhouse to only cover a portion of the land around a turntable, but there are fully circular roundhouses, such as these preserved roundhouses:

- The roundhouse that serves as the basis for the Baltimore and Ohio Railroad Museum in Baltimore, Maryland, US
- The Roundhouse in London, England, now an arts centre.
- Junee Roundhouse Railway Museum

== By country ==
Function of a railway turntable on Upsala-Lenna Jernväg in Sweden

=== Hungary ===
Miskolc Tiszai railway station retains an active turntable as of December 2021.

=== India ===
There was a turntable at the Talaguppa end of the Shimoga-Talaguppa railway, and one at Howbagh Railway Station near Jabalpur on the Balaghat-Jabalpur Narrow Gauge Line. Both were used to turn the railbuses serving on these lines. After railbuses were replaced by MEMUs, turntables were dismantled.

In 2012, Mumbai Metro One, the BOT operator of the Mumbai Metro Line 1, announced that it had procured turntables to be used on the Rapid Transit system.

=== Israel ===
The Israel Railway Museum, Haifa, has a turntable made by Metropolitan Carriage, Wagon & Finance Company, Old Park Works, Wednesbury. It was found buried in the grounds of the Israel Defense Forces History Museum, on the site of the old Jaffa railway station yard.

=== Romania ===
Like most ex-socialist countries of Eastern Europe, Romania still has several turntables in operational use. One can even see twin turntables, each with their own 180 degree roundhouse, like for one example at Timisoara.

=== Sri Lanka ===
In Sri Lanka, most turntables which were used in the steam area have been abandoned. Most were situated at the major railway yards like Kandy, Galle, Nanu Oya, Anuradhapura, Maho, Galoya, Trincomalee, Batticaloa, Polgahawela Jnc, Badulla, Puttulam, and Bandarawela and depots in Dematagoda 2no. and Maradana. All turntables in Sri Lanka Railways were operated manually. They were used to turn some rolling stock and non-dual cab locomotives. Most turntables were later scrapped, though some have been preserved in museums.

=== United Kingdom ===
In Britain, where steam-hauled trains usually had vacuum-operated brakes, it was quite common for turntables to be operated by vacuum motors worked from the locomotive's vacuum ejector or pump via a flexible hose or pipe, although there are a few manually and electrically operated examples. The major manufacturers were Ransomes and Rapier, Ipswich and Cowans Sheldon, Carlisle. The Great Western Railway (GWR) built several tables for its own use; there is little evidence any other companies did so.

=== United States ===
Due to the asymmetric design of many locomotives, turntables still in use are more common in North America than in Europe, where locomotive design favors configurations with a controller cabin on both ends or in the middle. In San Francisco, US, the Powell cable car line uses turntables at the end of the routes, since the cable cars have operating controls at only one end of the car. The Long Island Rail Road still has a turntable and roundhouse at the Richmond Hills yard.

== Surviving turntables ==
Several working examples remain, many on heritage railways in Great Britain, and also in the United States. Some examples are:

Surviving turntables

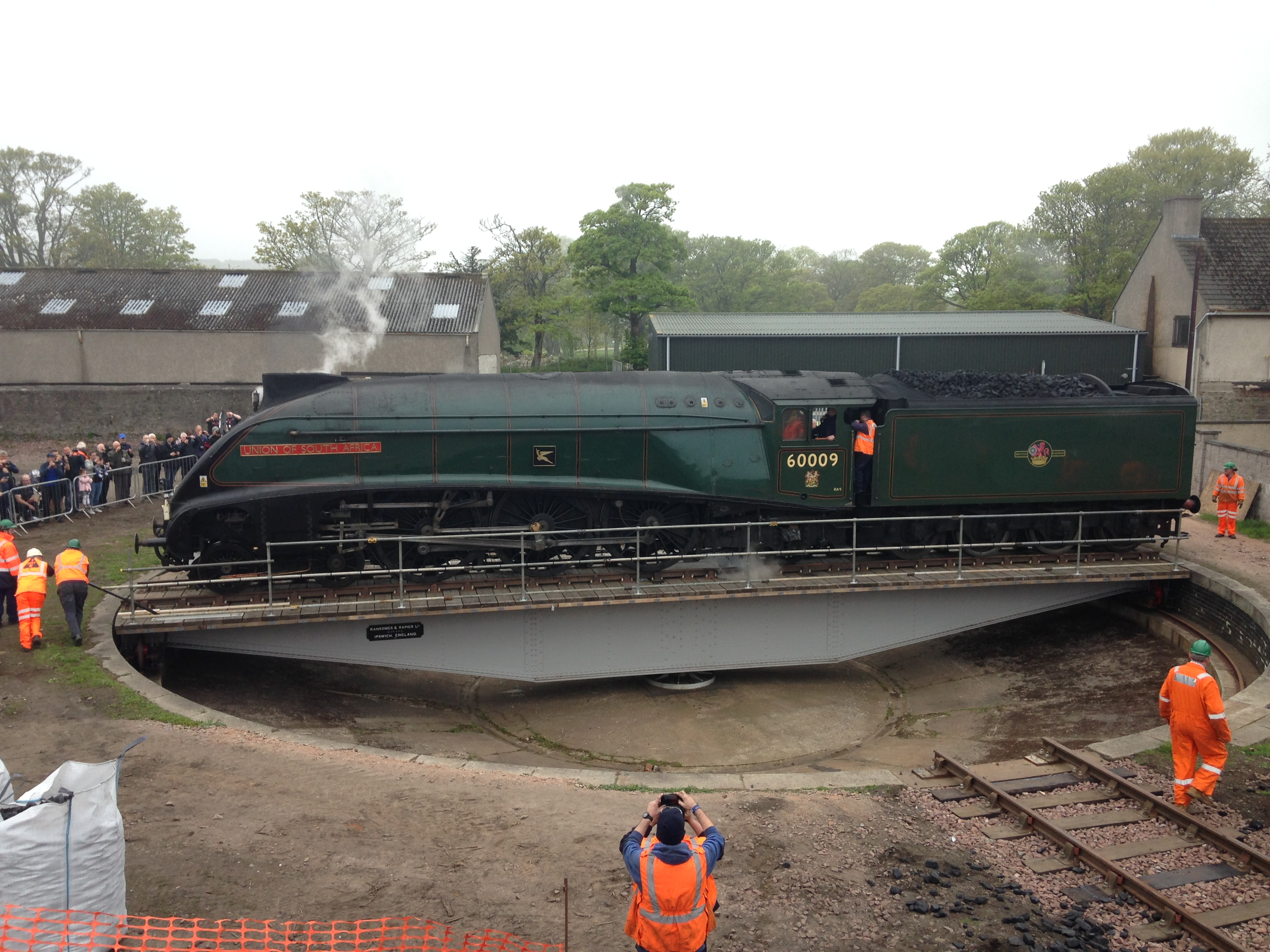
LNER Class A4 4488 Union of South Africa on the Ferryhill turntable, May 2019

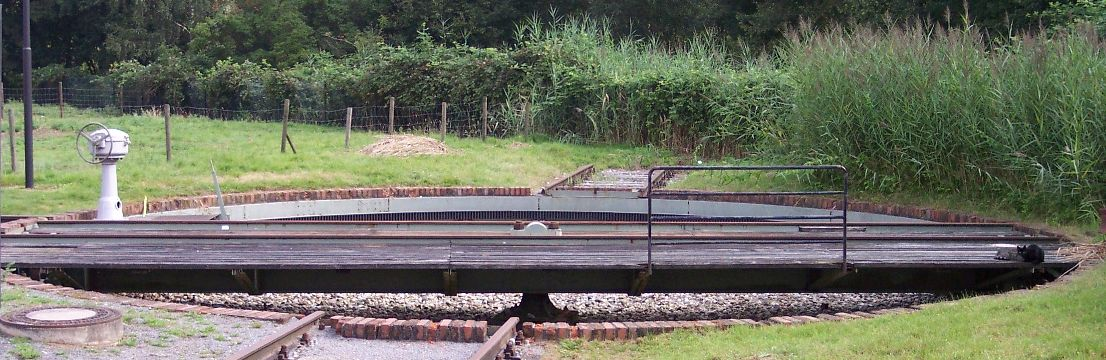
A small turntable at the Bocholt textile museum

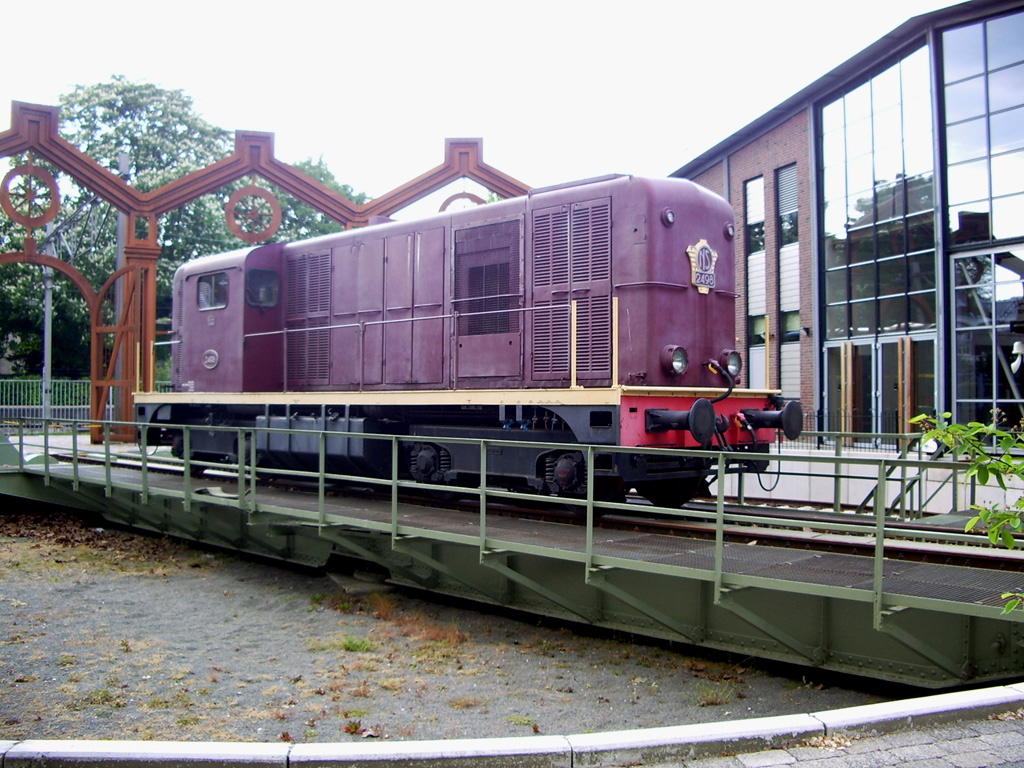
Railway Museum (Spoorwegenmuseum) in Utrecht

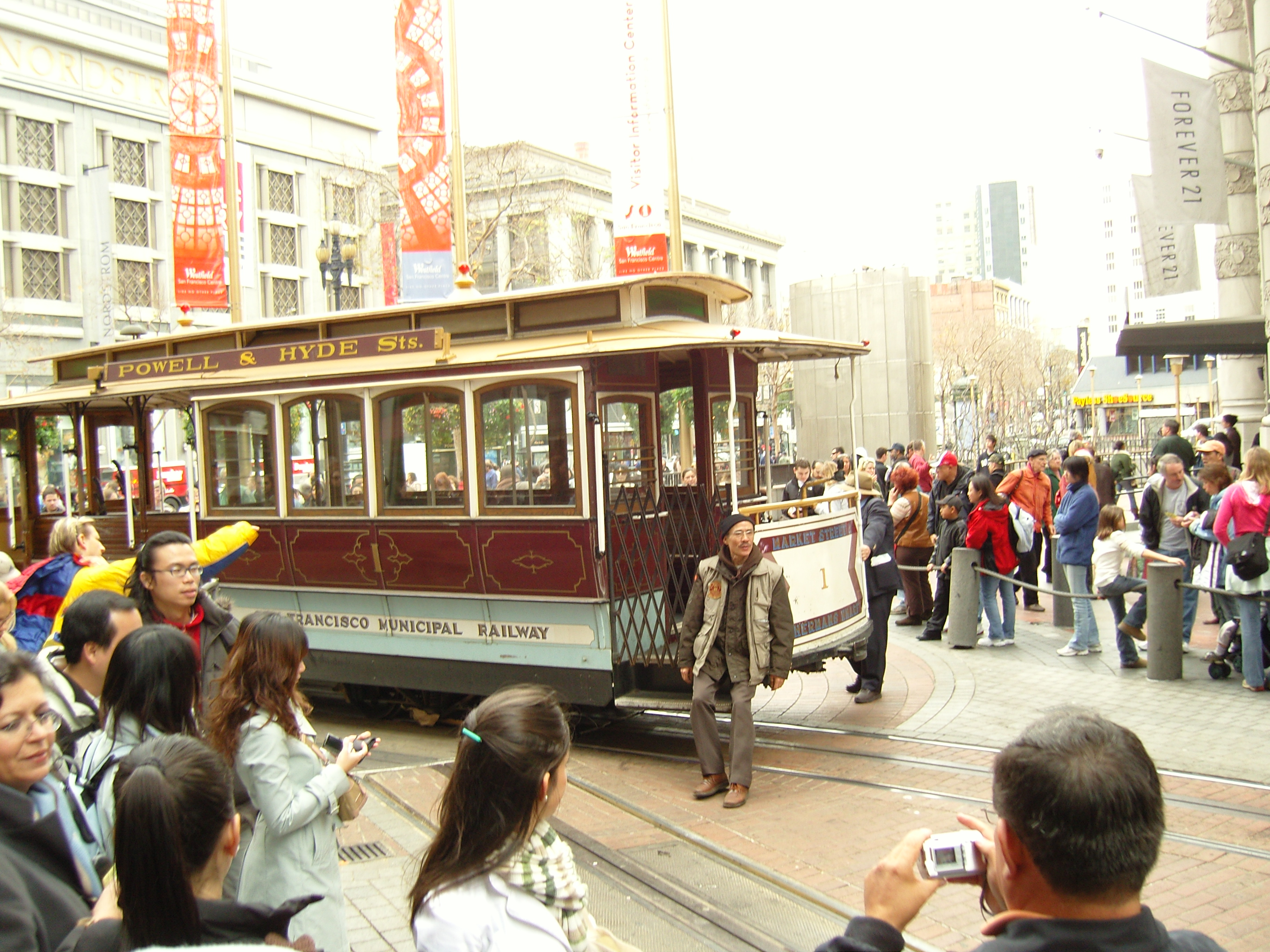
Drivers turning a cable car on a turntable on the San Francisco cable car system at Market Street, San Francisco

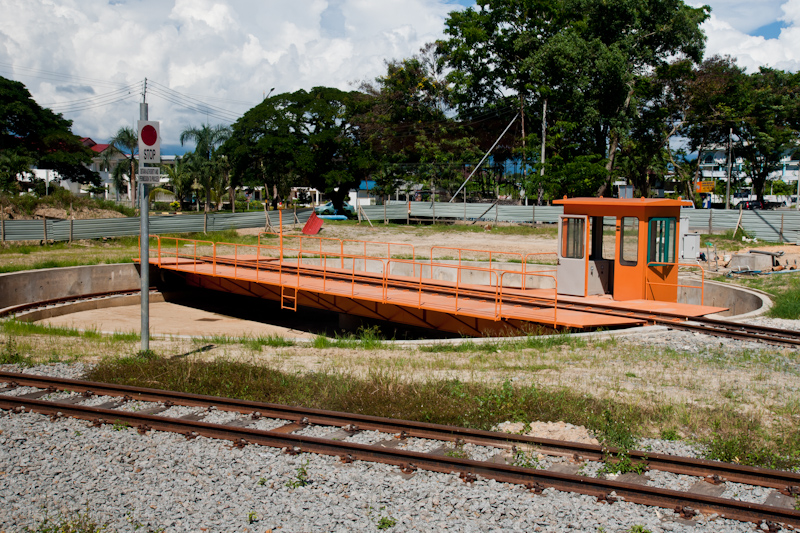
Turntable on the Sabah State Railway at Papar Station (Sabah, Malaysia)
- Aberdeen, Ferryhill - 1906 70' Ransomes and Rapier (Restored by Ferryhill Railway Heritage Trust and in regular use for steam charters to Aberdeen since 2019 http://www.frht.org.uk)
- Aviemore - ex Kyle of Lochalsh
- Barrow Hill Cowans Sheldon 5231/1931
- Bryson City, North Carolina - Great Smoky Mountains Railroad (Bethlehem Steel, 1937 ex-Bangor & Aroostook)
- Carnforth
- Chattanooga, Tennessee- Tennessee Valley Railroad Museum Soule Shops (American Bridge Company, 1916; ex-Central of Georgia Railway)
- Chunghua, Taiwan - Still working with roundhouse and open to the public. synapticism.com
- Conklin, New York - Working 78-foot turntable at East Binghamton railroad yard (built in the 1990s), operated by Canadian Pacific Railway. Old roundhouse still survives near the yard on private property, currently in poor condition. Filled-in turntable base for the roundhouse can still be seen as well.
- Currie, Minnesota's End O' Line Railroad Park & Museum
- Churston ex Goodrington
- Cultra; Ulster Folk and Transport Museum (Northern Ireland); 60' Ransomes and Rapier table ex Athenry, Co. Galway. Covered over with flooring; can be operated when required.
- Derby Works - within Bombardiers site, ca. 72' dia.. ( 52.905126,-1.457706 )
- Derby Roundhouse - table is in situ; but under the floor - see (http://www.railblue.com/pages/Related%20Rail%20Blue%20Info/DLWorks.revist.htm Archived 2015-01-15 at the Wayback Machine)
- Dublin, Connolly Locomotive Depot; (Republic of Ireland) 55' (Manuf. and date not known) sees regular use.
- Dublin, Connolly Station;(Republic of Ireland) Cowans Sheldon 4369/1924; 45' dia; still sees occasional use.
- Dallas (McKinney Avenue)
- Darlington North Road - out of use south of the station, west side of line.
- Didcot Ex Southampton Docks c.1976 - 70' Ransomes and Rapier E2334/1935
- Fort William ex Marylebone, Cowans Sheldon CS 6355/1937, refurbished by RRMH 1999-2000
- Heaton, NoT
- Hither Green; at rear of depot (ex Cannon Street table)
- Hornsey Ferme Park; now removed to York and in use there 2012.
- Guadalajara, Ferromex
  (20.648218°N 103.343494°W)
- Kidderminster ex Fort William; 70' Cowans Sheldon 8710/1945
- Keighley ex Garsdale, Cowans Sheldon of 1884
- Rhaetian Railway, Landquart, (1889) and Samedan, Switzerland. Both are in use
- Neville Hill
- NRM York
- Old Oak Common the final one of the four: now removed to Swanage
- Oyster Bay Railroad Museum
- Port Jervis Erie Turntable (ca. 1940s Port Jervis, New York)
- Portland, Oregon, at the Oregon Rail Heritage Center
- Railtown 1897 State Historic Park in Jamestown, California
- Raleigh, North Carolina - Working 100-foot turntable (1917) in downtown district near the old Seaboard Station, operated by CSX Transportation.
- Peak Rail, Rowsley South ex Mold Junction 60', CS 6181/1937
- Minehead, part of West Somerset Railway
- Pickering- ex York
- San Francisco cable car system – three in revenue service, one at car barn
- Statfold Barn – new build ca.2007, ca.15', triple gauge.
- Scarborough - ex Gateshead
- St Blazey, Cornwall. Roundhouse and associated working turntable
- Summerville, Georgia-Chattooga and Chickamauga Railway
- Sudbury, Ontario - the 100-foot working electrically-powered turntable at Sudbury Yard, operated by Canadian Pacific Railway sees almost daily use in turning diesels for local and mainline service.
- Spencer, North Carolina - Robert Julian Roundhouse and 100-foot working turntable (1924) at the historic North Carolina Transportation Museum.
- Swanage 55' ex Neasden LT
- Swindon - old Works area; GWR 1902 65'; listed structure.
- Tournon-sur-Rhone - Train De L'Ardeche, steam train with manually operated turntable in France.
- Tyseley
- Tanfield Rly. – Marley Hill - ca.15'
- Toronto Railway Museum Original 120-foot CPR John St Roundhouse turntable restored in situ and operational
- Veracruz, Ferrosur
  (19.19968°N 96.14607°W)
- Wansford
- West Seneca, New York - Pennsylvania Railroad Shops and Roundhouse with 108-foot turntable (1918)
- Yeovil Junction Cowans Sheldon works no. 9031 of ca.1946
- Whitehead (Northern Ireland) - installed 2016; ex Belfast Central Services Depot (Manufacturer, diameter and date not known)

The following are in storage, awaiting installation at UK sites:

- Barry Rly. – 65' outer race. Dismantled (ex Bricklayers Arms 1970s; moved from Mid Hants Rly.)
- North Norfolk Rly., Dismantled; to be installed at Holt 2017. Ex South Devon Rly. - (ex Hull Botanic Gardens in 2005; built 1955, 60 ft)
- Midland Railway Centre – Swanwick Jnc. – Dismantled - Hand powered, Balanced 60', (ex Chinley).
- Severn Valley Rly. - Dismantled (ex Bristol Bath Road) Stored at Eardington. Intention is to install at Bridgnorth. 65' 3" Ransom Rapier built 1957
- East Lancs Rly. – Dismantled (ex Germany) – stored at Buckley Wells
- Dean Forest Rly. - Dismantled (ex Calais Shed, SNCF, ex MLST Loughborough.)
- Mid Norfolk Rly. – 60' Dismantled R&R 1933 (ex Hitchin LNER; ex Quainton, never installed there) to be installed at Dereham.
- WCRC; stored Dismantled at Carnforth; was proposed for Weymouth; ex Tyseley Locomotive Works Ltd.(onetime proposal to install at Stratford upon Avon) - ex Thornaby
- Swanage Rly. Furzebrook ex Old Oak Common Depot 2011 - BR (WR) 70' /125T ?E CS 9709/53 in use at Old Oak Common until 2008, used for HST power car turning etc.
- Mallaig, Network Rail – Dismantled, scheme to install the ex Whitchurch table which is stored at Corpach or Fort William.
- Stainmore Rly.Co., Kirkby Stephen East; 50' or? 65', outer race, hand powered. Ex Darlington station. Moved 1/2017.

New build turntable. Hitachi Rail Europe's rolling stock plant at Newton Aycliffe in County Durham has an 80 tonne locomotive turntable and a bogie test turntable; supplied by Lloyds British Somers Group in 2016.

The former Chicago, Milwaukee, St. Paul & Pacific (Milwaukee Road) in Janesville, Wisconsin. Used now by the regional Wisconsin & Southern

== Accidents ==
In the United States, when deciding liability for turntable accidents, most state courts followed the precedent set by the United States Supreme Court in Sioux City & Pacific R.R. v. Stout (1873). In that case, a six-year-old child was playing on the unguarded, unfenced turntable when his friends began turning it. While attempting to get off, his foot became stuck and was crushed. The Court held that although the railroad was not bound by the same duty of care to strangers as it was to its passengers, it would be liable for negligence "if from the evidence given it might justly be inferred by the jury that the defendant, in the construction, location, management, or condition of its machine has omitted that care and attention to prevent the occurrence of accidents which prudent and careful men ordinarily bestow."

In the case of Chicago B. & Q.R. Co. v. Krayenbuhl (1902), a four-year-old child was playing on an unlocked, unguarded railroad turntable. Other children set the turntable in motion, and it severed the ankle of the young child. The child's family sued the railroad company on a theory of negligence and won at trial. The Nebraska Supreme Court held that the railroad company may have been liable for negligence after considering the "character and location of the premises, the purpose for which they are used, the probability of injury therefrom, the precautions necessary to prevent such injury, and the relations such precautions bear to the beneficial use of the premises." However, the Supreme Court reversed the trial court's decision based on an improper jury instruction as to the evidence.

Accidents to locomotives sometimes occurred. For example, if the turntable was incorrectly set and a locomotive was accidentally started or failed to stop, it might fall into the turntable pit.

On rare occasions, a turntable would spin too fast during high winds, as happened at Garsdale (Settle–Carlisle line) in the UK c.1900. At this very exposed location, this was resolved by surrounding the turntable with a wooden stockade made from old sleepers.

== Unusual turntables ==
- The roundhouse in Montluçon, France, was equipped with a separate turntable and sector plate, which is a table pivoted at one end, in this case at the edge of the turntable. The sector plate served the side of the roundhouse that housed autorails with less requirement for turning. Both the turntable and sector plate were served by separate connections to the roundhouse. If turning was required the two could be connected together. The resulting roundhouse was not completely circular. Part of the roundhouse with the turntable is still extant. A similar, operational sector plate is located in Bavaria at the German Steam Locomotive Museum.
- Due to a lack of space at Ventnor railway station, a small turntable was provided to allow steam engines to run around their trains. Other stations with this arrangement included Bembridge, Withernsea and Harcourt Street.
- The last remaining operational triple-gauge turntable in the world, used to station trains into the 23 bay roundhouse, exists at the Steamtown Heritage Centre in Peterborough, South Australia.
- A turntable exists on the Midland Line, New Zealand at Arthurs Pass in New Zealand. Steam engines on excursions cannot enter the Otira tunnel so must be turned around for the return
Unusual turntables

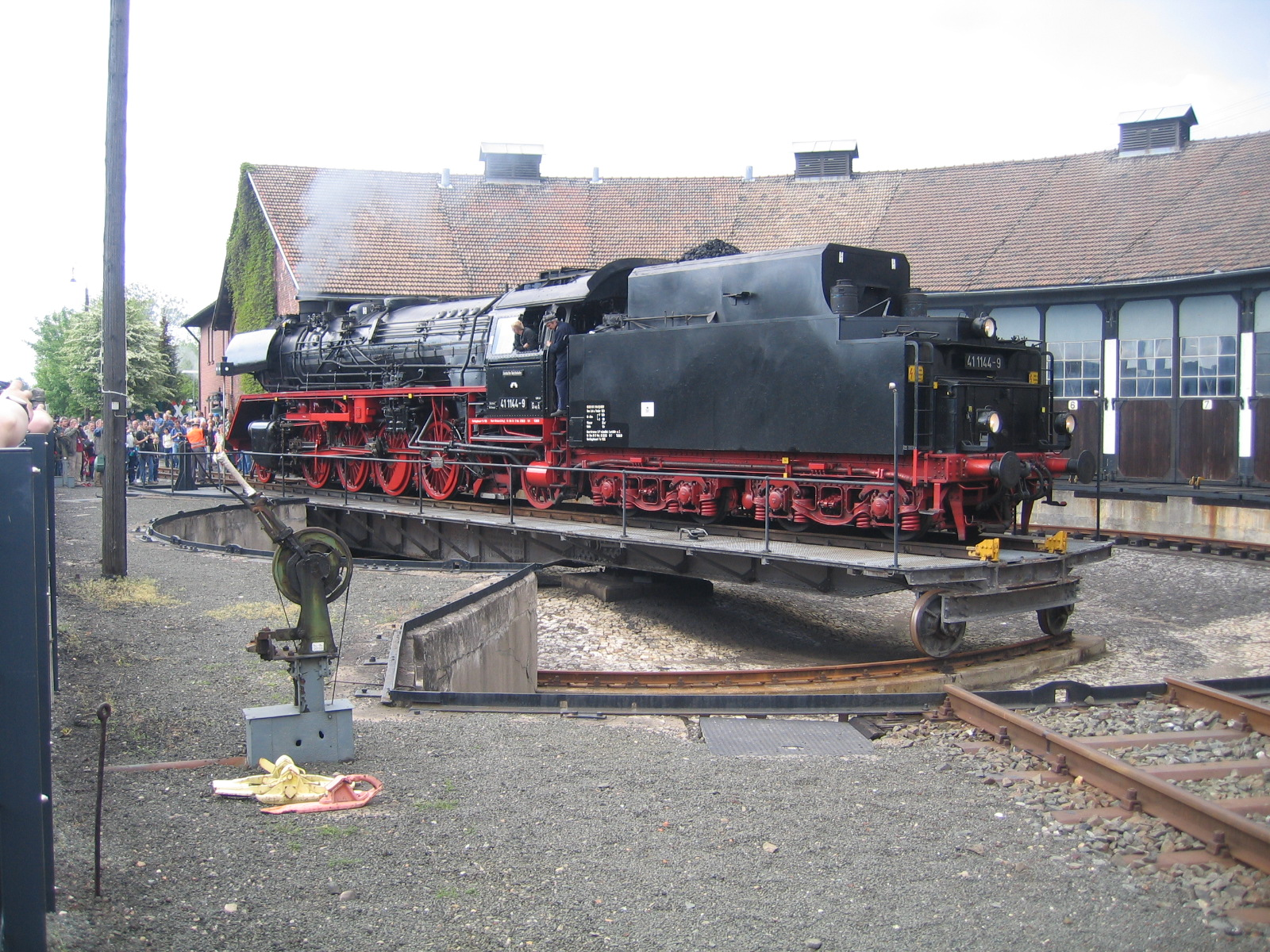
A heavy German goods locomotive on the turntable at the German Steam Locomotive Museum, Bavaria. The pivot of this turntable is off-center, which prevents the turntable from rotating a full 360 degrees.

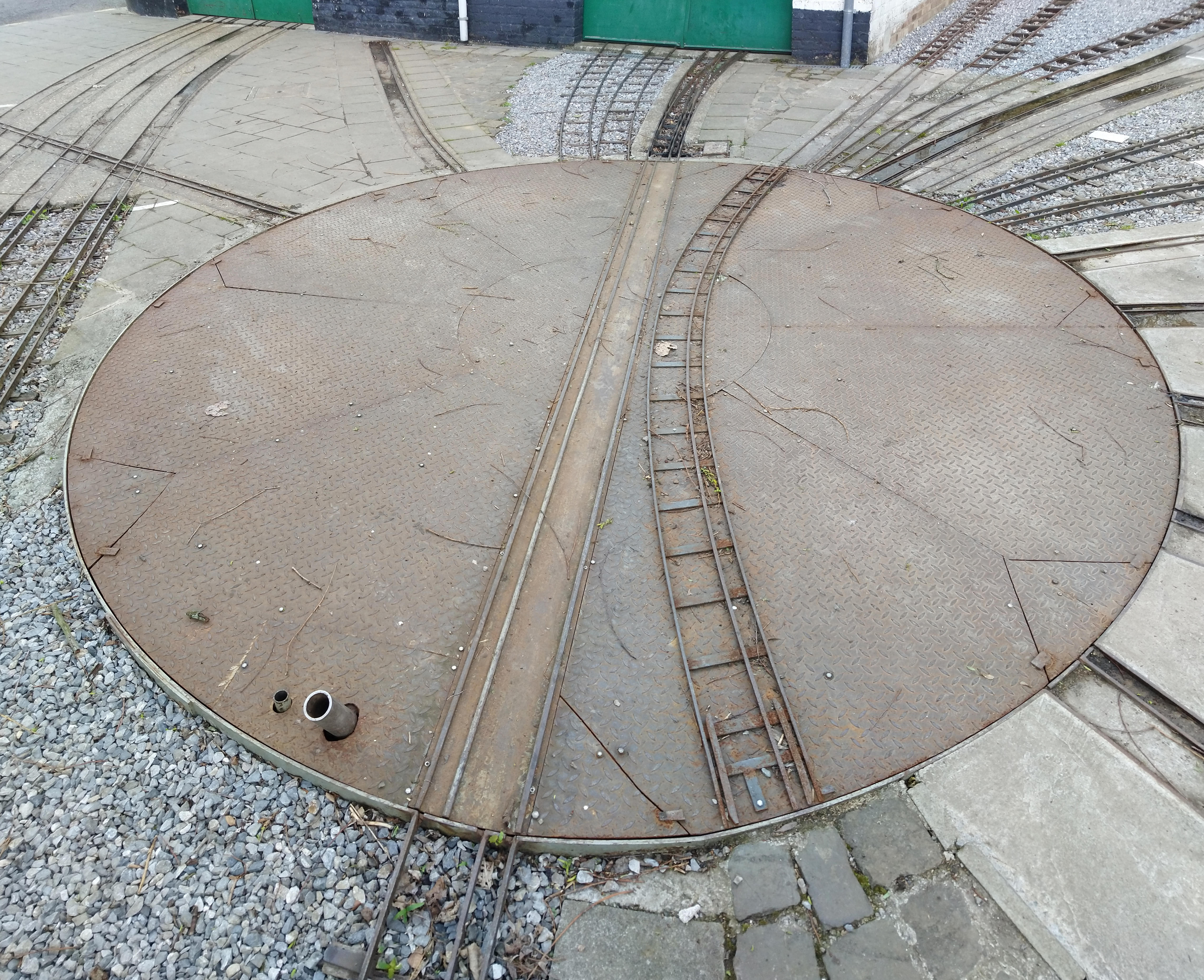
Twin-gauge straight + curved turntable at Petit Train à Vapeur de Forest, Brussels

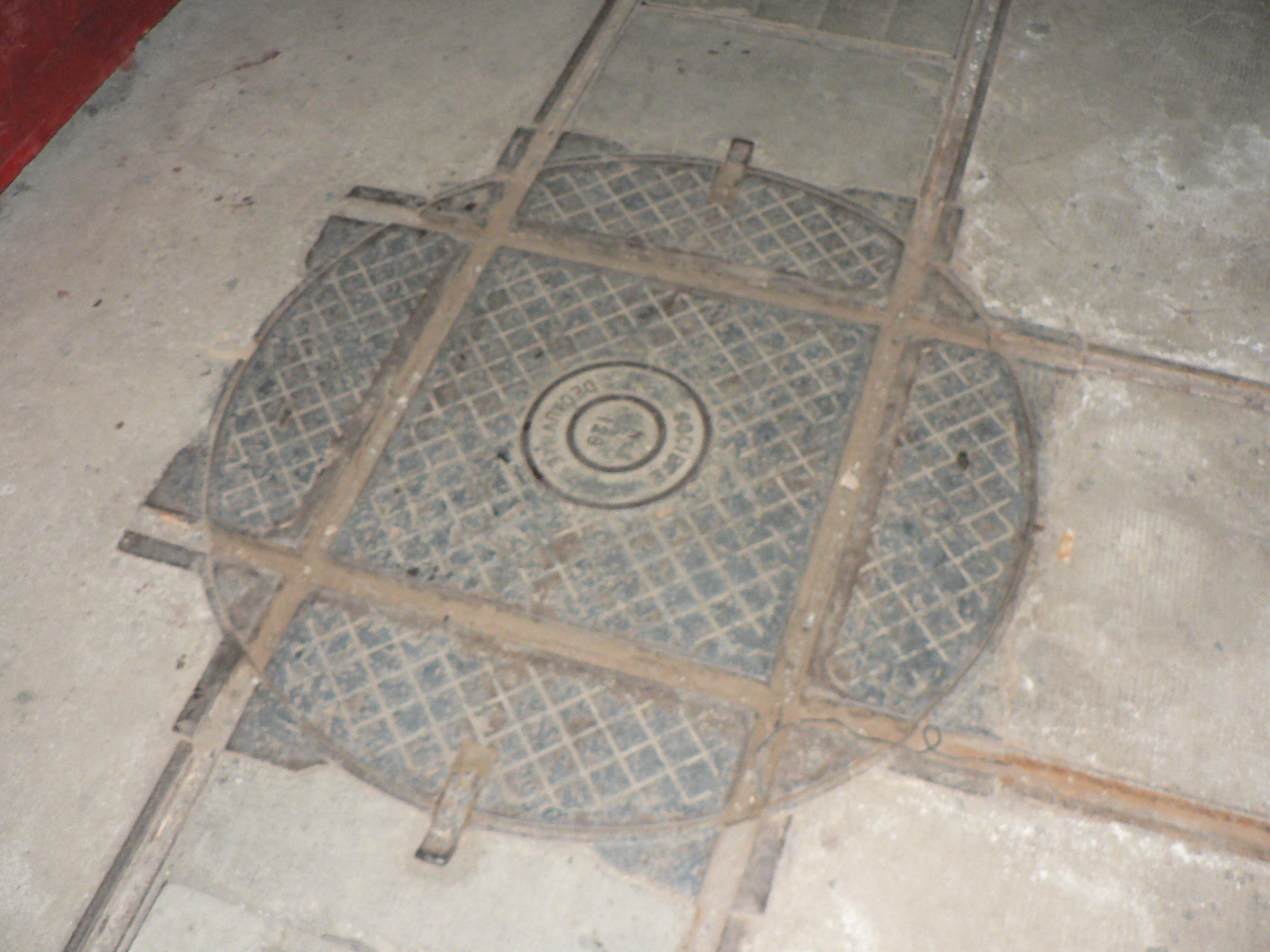
Decauville turntable

== Multiple turntables ==
Stations housing large numbers of engines may have more than one turntable:

- (United Kingdom) Old Oak Common TMD – formerly 4
- (Australia) Enfield – formerly 3 (none survives today)
- (Australia) Broadmeadow – 2 (3rd removed, now in Thirlmere, NSW)
- (Sweden) Falun – 2
- (Sweden) Hallsberg – 2
- (Sweden) Gothenburg Sävenäs yard – 2 (Second removed ~2005)
- (New Zealand) Linwood – formerly 2 (second removed during 1980/1990s)
- (Spain) Valladolid (41.6403°N 4.7292°W) – 2

== See also ==
- List of railway roundhouses, most or all of which include a turntable.
- Wye – a way of turning whole trains.
- Balloon loop - another way of turning whole trains.
- Transfer table (UK: 'traverser') – provides access to two or more parallel tracks in a space saving manner like a turntable, but without the ability to turn.
- Nowadays control cars, or coaches with controls at one end, have largely eliminated the need for turntables.
- Singapore and Hong Kong have a combined traverser-turntable that takes 4-car sets.
