= Louis Heinrici =

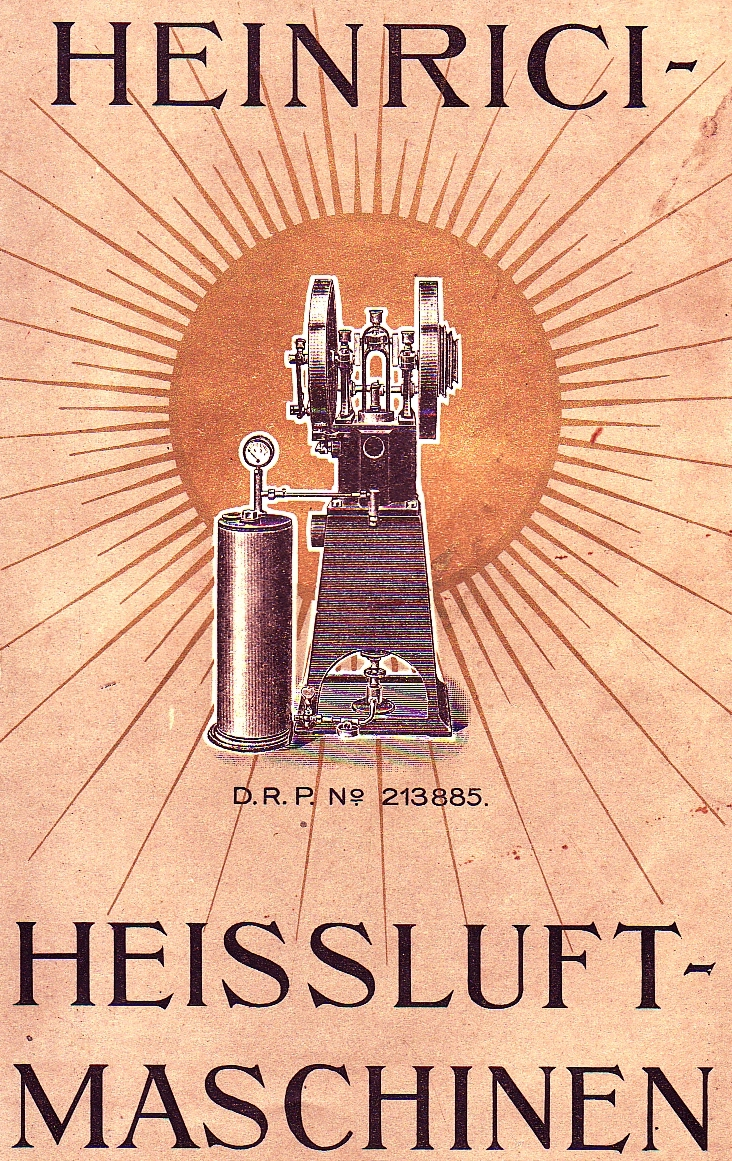
Heinrici product catalogue, 1914

Louis Heinrici (1847 - c.1930) was a German industrialist and manufacturer.

== Personal life ==
Louis Heinrici was born on 30 July 1847 in Torgau and died c.1930 in Zwickau. He married Marie Elisabeth (Born Deustler) with whom he had three sons: Joseph Hans Louis Heinrici, Ernst Hermann Heinrici and Rudolf Heinrici.

== Business ==
In 1876, Louis Heinrici began to manufacture hot air engines, and other small engines, initially in rented rooms. His first factory building was built in 1884 in Zwickau (Saxony). The factory started with two workers, a lathe and a forge. The official company name was: Louis Heinrici, mechanical workshops for precision work, Zwickau in Saxony. The hot-air engines produced by Heinrici, as a mass-produced product, were widely used in the commercial and private sectors because they served as inexpensive and reliable sources of power.

In 1914, the factory had areas for metalworking, plumbing, a paint shop, another building for the turning shop and a laboratory and trial room for test runs, as well as an office building for sales offices and warehouses. In the park-like landscaped gardens were ponds 4 metres in diameter. These were provided with decorative fountains, which were powered by Heinrici engines.

In his 1914 catalogue, Heinrici stated: "Today after 38 years of activity, I still make the same article on a large scale, which I - thanks to thorough study of all relevant issues of a scientific and technical nature for the construction of such machines, as well as tireless forward striving for attainable perfection - have achieved first place in world trade". After 38 years, Heinrici had sold 21,000 machines.

== Hot air engines ==
For several decades, Louis Heinrici had built hot air engines in twelve sizes from 26 to 190 mm piston diameter and in the power range from 1.5 W to 0.2 kW. The larger machines used liquid cooling while, in the smaller ones, air cooling was sufficient. The running speed under load was between 120 and 200 revolutions per minute. The power output, by piston diameter, was:

- 26 mm = 1/550 hp
- 40 mm = 1/60 hp
- 80 mm = 1/12 hp
- 100 mm = 1/8 hp
- 190 mm = 1/2 hp

The above may not be a complete list. The Stirling Engine website gives some intermediate sizes. In the 1920s, Ernst Heinrici introduced an improved engine which could be run at up to 400 rpm. It was available in six sizes from 1/50 to 1/2 horsepower and was on sale up to 1940.

The machines could be heated by gas, liquid or solid fuels (luminescent gas, kerosene, wood). They weighed between 26 kg for the smallest and 660 kg for the largest machine.

Engineer E. Patzert, then a teacher of engineering at a school in Zwickau, carried out tests on some Heinrici machines and stated in his test report: "The experimental engines, all of which were chosen casually from a number of completed machines, were characterized by quiet, steady running and were, in terms of lubrication and maintenance, extremely undemanding".

=== Advantages ===
Advantages of the machines included:

- Noiseless operation,
- Slow running - minimum wear
- No smell (exhaust gases)
- Easy operation, ready for immediate use
- Completely safe
- Can be heated by any fuel
- Can be erected anywhere, without official approval.
- No dependence on gas, electricity or water

=== Applications ===
- Fans and blowers
- Shop window advertising turntable
- Turntable for Christmas tree stand
- Driving all kinds of water pumps
- Operation of fountains
- Electricity generation with a dynamo
- Agitators and shakers in hospitals, laboratories and the chemical industry
