= Manson-Guise Engine =

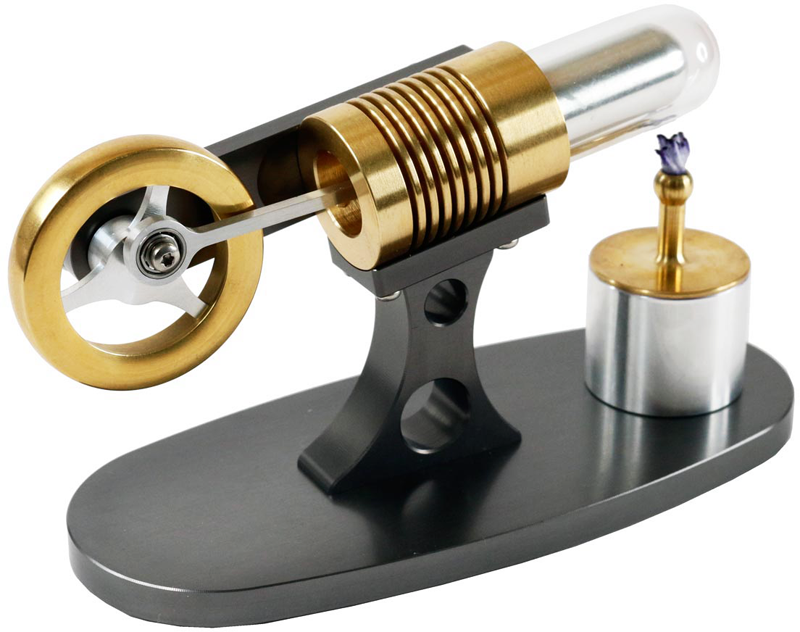
Manson-Guise engine

Manson-Guise Engine drawing, based on GB2554458A

Manson guise animation

A Manson-Guise engine is a simplified, albeit less powerful version of a Manson engine. It is a type of hot air engine, converting a temperature difference into motion. There is a hot side and a cold side to the engine. Providing there is a large enough temperature difference between the two sides the engine will run. The Manson-Guise engine is probably the simplest type of hot air engines having only a single con-rod, with a displacer piston and power piston that move at the same time. Manson-Guise engines, like Manson engines and beta Stirling engines, can run bidirectionally.

== Similarities to Stirling engines ==
Manson-Guise engines share some similarities with Stirling engines but with two major differences. Firstly with a Stirling engine the air inside is repeatedly heated and cooled. With a Manson-Guise engine the Manson engine draws in and expels air. Secondly a Manson-Guise engine is able to have a single connecting rod and counterintuitively the displacer piston and power piston are on the same shaft and move at the same time.

== The Manson-Guise Cycle ==
At the top dead centre and bottom dead centre, valves open briefly with the rest of the time the valves being closed. Both the displacer piston and power piston move together in the same direction at the same time. At the end of each stroke a valve is opened. This releases pressure or vacuum so the next cycle can begin.

The Manson cycle can be summarised into 4 parts:

- When heading towards the heat, the displacer piston is shuttling air inside the engine to the cold side, cooling and contracting the air, which in turn pulls on the power piston.
- A valve is briefly opened relieving the vacuum pressure. This prepares the engine for the next stroke. The flywheel provides energy to push the engine into the next stroke.
- When the pistons are heading away from the heat source the displacer is shuttling air inside the engine to the hot side, expanding the air which builds up pressure and drives the power piston.
- A valve is briefly opened relieving the pressure inside the engine. This prepares the engine for the next stroke. The flywheel provides energy to push the engine into the next stroke.

=== Development ===
Chris Guise, the workshop manager and engine designer at Kontax Engineering Ltd was developing a Manson engine to add to the existing range of hot air engines the company manufactured and sold. While developing and prototyping a Manson engine he had the idea for an improved the design. After a few design revisions this resulted in a simpler design which reduces production costs and increases performance of the engine due to air having a similar flow.

=== Public release ===
The Manson-Guise engine was first shown to the public on 15 Aug 2016 through a kickstarter project launch.

=== Efficiency ===
The Manson-Guise engine efficiency has yet to be tested but is expected to be less than the Stirling engine cycle efficiency due to drawing in cold air and expelling hot air.
