= Rider-Ericsson Engine Company =

Successor of the DeLamater Iron Works and the Rider Engine Company

- Industry: Manufacturing and transportation
- Founded: 1897
- Headquarters: New York, United States

The Rider-Ericsson Engine Company of New York was founded in 1897, combining the plants, engines, and patterns of two earlier companies, the Rider Engine Company and the DeLamater Iron Works.

Captain John Ericsson had worked with founders of both companies. Cornelius H. DeLamater, founder of DeLamater Iron Works, had worked with Ericsson to develop Ironclad warships during the American Civil War. Alexander K. Rider and Ericsson had founded the Rider Engine company in 1879 in Walden, NY to manufacture hot air engines. Based on the technologies and patents of its founders, Rider Engine became the world's largest manufacturer of hot air engines.

== Engines ==
The company specialized in hot air pumping engines. A hot air engine is an external combustion engine. Hot air engines have a hot side and a cold side. Mechanical energy is derived from a hot air engine as air is repeatedly heated and cooled, expanding and contracting, and imparting pressure upon a reciprocating piston.

== Early hot air engines ==
In his patent of 1759, Henry Wood was the first to document the powering an engine by the changing volume of air as it changed temperature. George Cayley was the first to build a working model in 1807. Robert Stirling is generally credited with the "invention" of the hot air engine in 1816 for his development of a "regenerator" which conserves heat energy as the air moves between the hot and cold sides of the engine. Not all hot air engines have regenerators, but the term hot air engine and Stirling engine are sometimes used interchangeably.

== Rider's engine ==
Rider engine

The Rider style engine is an "alpha" engine which uses two separate cylinders. As air in the hot side cylinder heats, it expands, driving the piston upward. The crankshaft now moves the cold side piston upward, drawing the hot air over to the cold side. The air cools, contracts, and pulls the hot side piston downward. The cold side piston then pushes the cool air over to the hot side, and the cycle repeats.

== Ericsson's engine ==
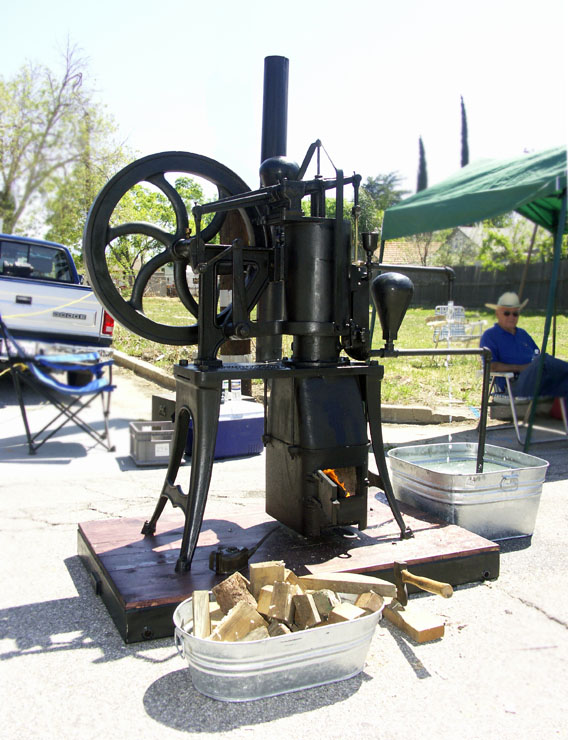
Ericsson engine

The Ericsson style engine is a "beta" engine, which contains both the power piston and displacer within one cylinder. The cylinder has a hot end, within the firebox, and a cold end, surrounded by a water jacket. As the air is heated within the cylinder, the air expands, driving the piston upward. The displacer next moves downward, pushing the air from the hot side into the cool side of the cylinder. The air then contracts, pulling the piston downward. The displacer then moves the air from the cool side to the hot side, the cycle begins again.
