= Vacuum engine =

Kind of engine

Animation of a vacuum engine

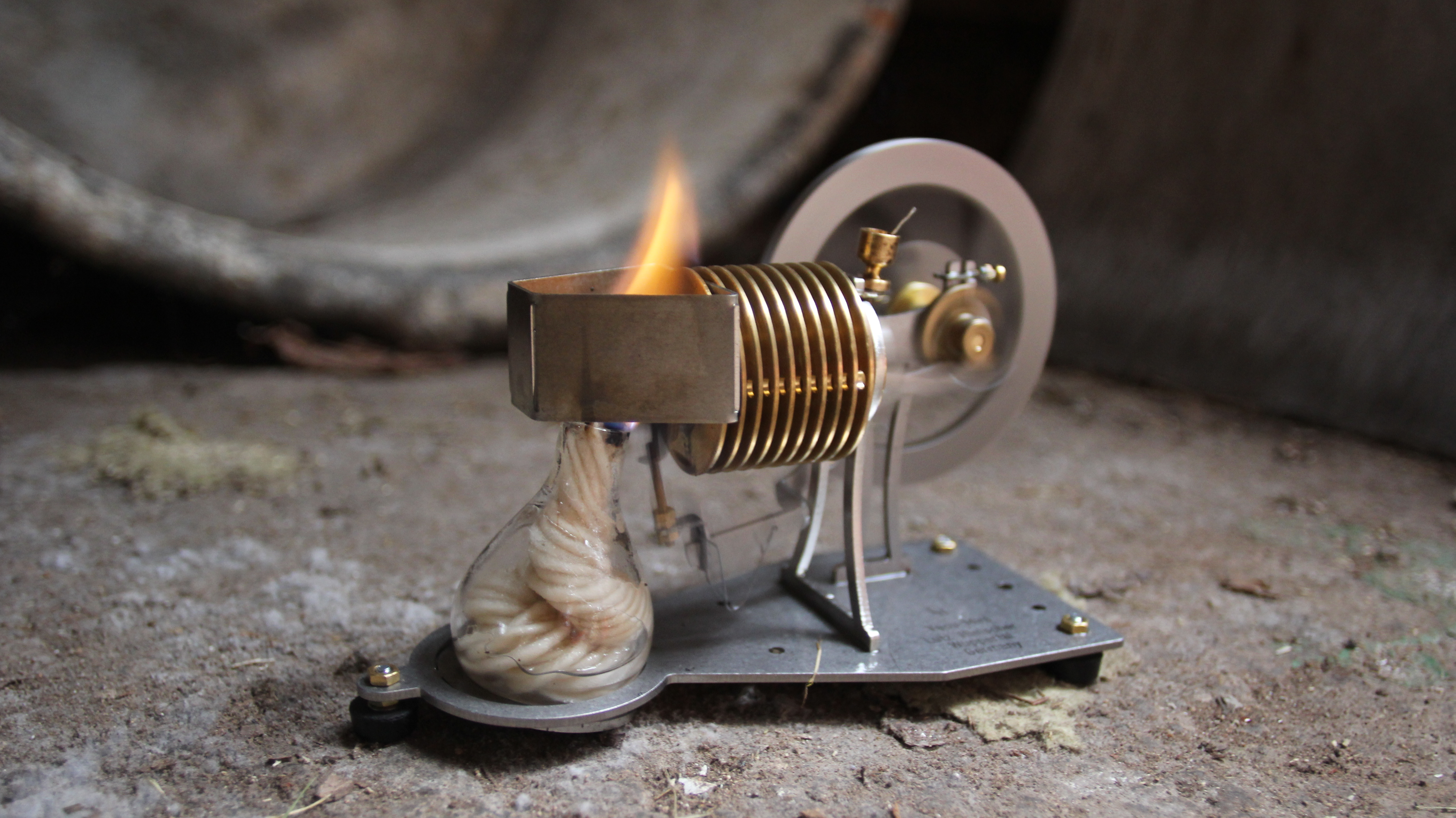
Photo of a flame-licker engine

A vacuum engine refers to any kind of engine which derives its force from air pressure against one side of the piston, while also having a partial vacuum on the other side of it. This pressure differential can be the result of heat transfer, or mechanically produced by an external source.

== History ==
Some early gas engines worked on the "vacuum" or "atmospheric" principle in a similar way to the Newcomen steam engine. A mixture of gas and air was eaten by the cylinder and ignited; the mixture expanded and part of it escaped through the exhaust valve; the valve then closed, the mixture cooled and contracted, and atmospheric pressure pushed the piston in. Such engines were very inefficient and were superseded by engines working on the Otto cycle.

== Heat engines ==
(also called flame-licker engine, flame-engine, or flame-dancer)

At the beginning of an intake stroke, a valve in the head of the cylinder opens and admits a charge of burning gas and air, which is trapped by the closing of the valve and expands. Towards the end of the stroke the charge comes into contact with a water- or air-cooled part of the cylinder and is chilled, causing a sudden drop in pressure sufficient to suck the piston – which is open towards the crank – back on the return stroke. The valve opens again in time for the piston to expel the burnt gases before the next stroke begins.

== Vacuum motor ==
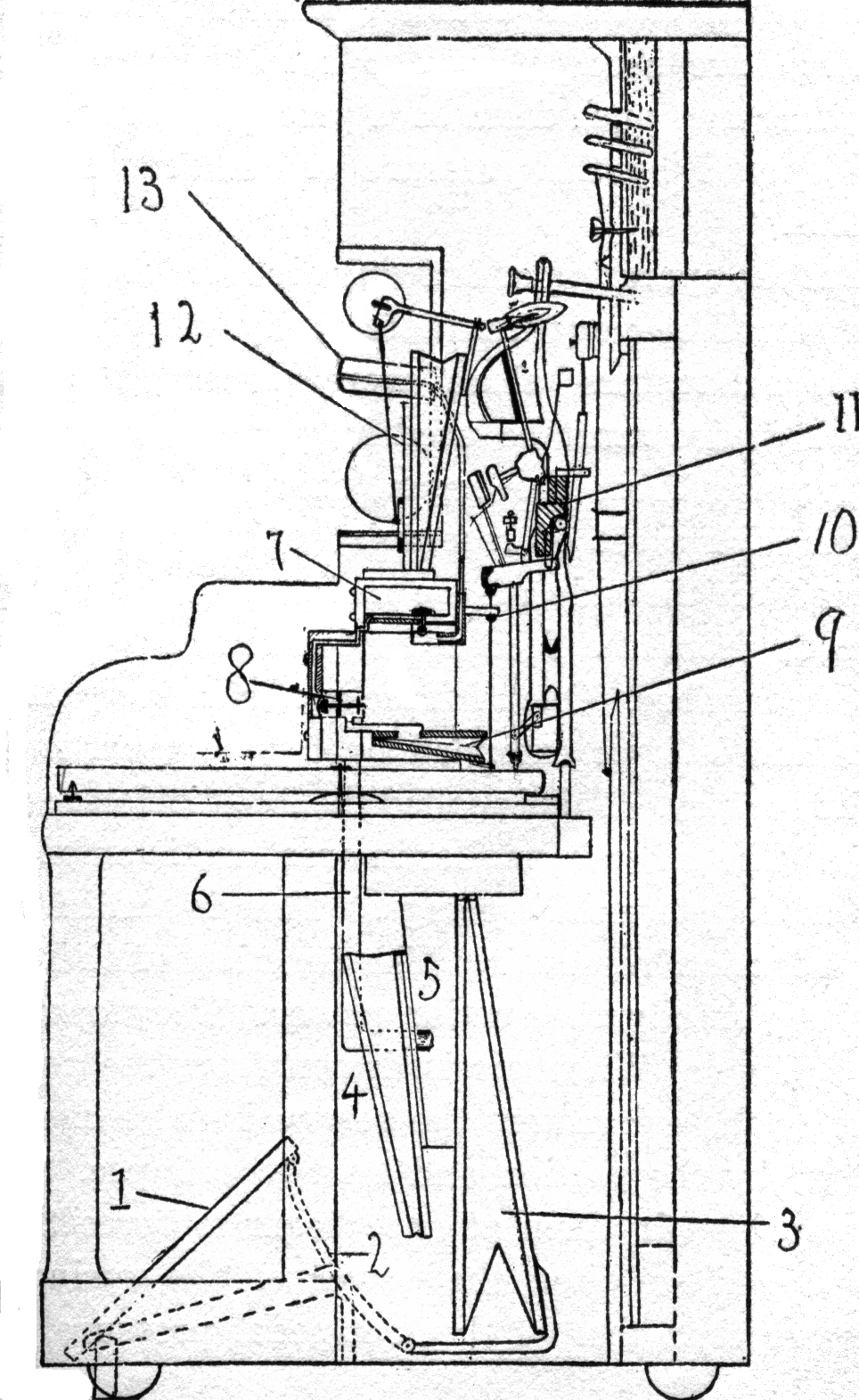
Sectional illustration of player piano interior action: 12. is the Pneumatic motor powered by 1. Pedal

In a vacuum motor, the partial vacuum is created by an external pump. These motors were commonly used to power railway turntables in the UK, using vacuum created by a steam locomotive's vacuum brake ejector. The operating principle is similar to a steam engine – in both cases power is extracted from a difference in pressure. (Note: The motor is similar to a steam engine, not identical, as steam engines operate from hot steam which also contains enthalpy in the form of heat.)

Small vacuum motors were also used to operate windscreen wipers in automobiles. In this case, the motors were powered by manifold vacuum. This arrangement was not very satisfactory because, if the throttle were wide open, the wipers would slow down, or even stop. Modern automobiles use electrically powered wipers. Modern automobiles still use a vacuum motor of a kind, however, the vacuum servo. Brakes are operated by a hydraulic system, but they use a ‘vacuum motor’ to amplify the force provided by the driver. Small vacuum motors were also used from the late 1960s to control servomechanisms such as door locks, (Note: Mercedes-Benz) heater controls (Note: Lancia Beta Montecarlo) or movable bonnet ventilation flaps. (Note: Dodge Charger)

Some Player piano use vacuum engines.

You could say that the global Industrial Revolution arose because of a 'vacuum motor', because all the early steam engines, especially the pioneering Boulton and Watt engines, operated with almost atmospheric pressure steam. You can easily make a demonstration vacuum engine using a flywheel, simple plumbing parts and a few other simple components, as Neil A Downie shows in the reference.

A vacuum system can be used for power transmission, although the maximum power that can be transmitted to a vacuum motor is less than conventional pneumatics. There is an optimum pressure for the operation of a vacuum power transmission system, of around 0.4 bar (8 psig), as Downie also shows. Although less efficient than pneumatics, it can be perfectly workable. For example, a 22 mm (7/8 in) pipe on vacuum can transmit as much power on 0.4 bar (8 psig) as a 6 mm (1/4 in) pipe on 8 bar (100 psig). The system is efficient enough that Boulton and Watt used vacuum power transmission in their factory. They called the vacuum main in the factory the ‘spirit pipe’.

== Ideal Thermodynamic Process ==
Unlike the ideal Otto cycle engine, the vacuum engine relies on a constant heat source provided by burning fuel. As mentioned above, a valve allows an intake of heat into the piston chamber. Estimating the heat in or Qin is constant in the controlled volume space, the ideal gas equation PV = nRT implies an increase in the pressure of the piston chamber. After the valve closes, the piston undergoes an adiabatic process during the downward stroke. Once the piston reaches the bottom of its stroke, the chamber is cooled either by the surrounding air or water, and the resulting Qout forces the pressure in the piston to decrease. The system then undergoes another adiabatic compression of the gas in the chamber, which is subsequently released by the valve at the top of the cylinder's stroke, while simultaneously allowing new heated gas to enter the chamber.

One of the major issues that this engine encountered while being developed was that the efficiency of this model was extremely poor in real applications. Because the heat source is not contained to a specific area, only a small portion of the potential fuel is being consumed to power the engine. Because Engine efficiency is defined by the relationship between the amount of work done and the potential energy in the fuel consumed, it can be seen that in the vacuum engine only a small amount of the burning fuel is being used to power the engine. The rest of the fuel energy is lost to the surrounding atmosphere.

== See also ==
- Hot air engine
- Stirling engine
