= Economizer =

Heat exchanger

Economizers (US and Oxford spelling), or economisers (UK), are mechanical devices intended to reduce energy consumption, or to perform a useful function such as preheating a fluid. The term economizer is used for other purposes as well. Boiler, power plant, heating, refrigeration, ventilating, and air conditioning (HVAC) may all use economizers. In simple terms, an economizer is a heat exchanger.

== Stirling engine ==
Robert Stirling's innovative contribution to the design of hot air engines in 1816 was the 'Economiser'. Later known as the regenerator, it stored heat from the hot portion of the engine as the air passed to the cold side, and released heat to the cooled air as it returned to the hot side. This innovation improved the efficiency of the Stirling engine enough to make it commercially successful in specific applications, and has since been a component of every air engine called a Stirling engine.

== Boilers ==
In boilers, economizers are heat-exchange devices that heat fluids, usually water, up to but not normally beyond the boiling point of that fluid. Economizers are so named because they can use the enthalpy in fluid streams that are hot, but not hot enough to be used in a boiler, thereby recovering more useful enthalpy and improving the boiler's efficiency. They are a device fitted to a boiler which saves energy by using the exhaust gases from the boiler to preheat the cold water used to fill it (the feed water).

Steam boilers use large amounts of energy raising feed water to the boiling temperature, converting the water to steam and sometimes superheating that steam above saturation temperature. Heat transfer efficiency is improved when the highest temperatures near the combustion sources are used for boiling and superheating, while using the residual heat of the cooled combustion gases exhausting from the boiler through an economizer to raise the temperature of feed water entering the steam drum.

An indirect-contact or direct-contact condensing economizer will recover the residual heat from the combustion products. A series of dampers, an efficient control system, and a ventilator allow all or part of the combustion products to pass through the economizer, depending on the demand for make-up water and/or process water. The temperature of the gases can be lowered from the boiling temperature of the fluid to a little more than the incoming feed water temperature while preheating that feed water to the boiling temperature. High-pressure boilers typically have larger economizer surfaces than low-pressure boilers. Economizer tubes often have projections like fins to increase the heat-transfer surface on the combustion gas side. On average over the years, boiler combustion efficiency has risen from 80% to more than 95%. The efficiency of heat produced is directly linked to boiler efficiency. The percentage of excess air and the temperature of the combustion products are two key variables in evaluating this efficiency.

The combustion of natural gas needs a certain quantity of air in order to be complete, so the burners need a flow of excess air in order to operate. Combustion produces water steam, and the quantity depends on the amount of natural gas burned. Also, the evaluation of the dew point depends on the excess air. Natural gas has different combustion efficiency curves linked to the temperature of the gases and the excess air. For example, if the gases are chilled to 38 °C and there is 15% excess air, then the efficiency will be 94%. The condensing economizer can thus recover the sensible and latent heat in the steam condensate contained in the flue gases for the process. The economizer is made of an aluminium and stainless steel alloy. The gases pass through the cylinder, and the water passes through the finned tubes. It condenses about 11% of the water contained in the gases.

=== History ===
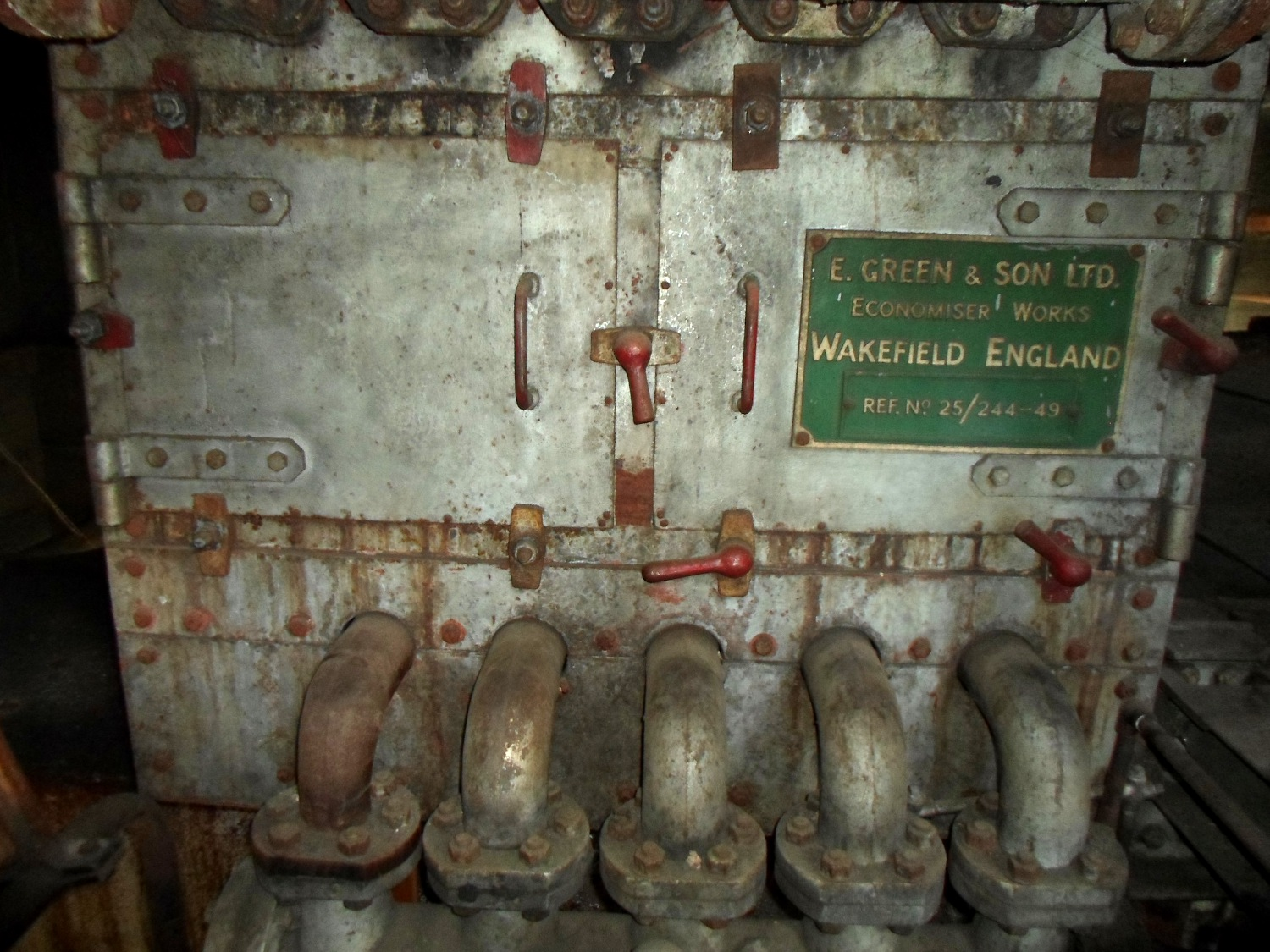
One of two original 1940s 'Green's Economisers' inside the Killafaddy Board Mills boiler house on the outskirts of Launceston

The first successful economizer design was used to increase the steam-raising efficiency of the boilers of stationary steam engines. It was patented by Edward Green in 1845, and since then has been known as Green's economiser. It consisted of an array of vertical cast iron tubes connected to a tank of water above and below, between which the boiler's exhaust gases passed. This is the reverse arrangement to that usually but not always seen in the fire tubes of a boiler; there the hot gases usually pass through tubes immersed in water, whereas in an economizer the water passes through tubes surrounded by hot gases. While both are heat exchange devices, in a boiler the burning gases heat the water to produce steam to drive an engine, whether piston or turbine, whereas in an economizer, some of the heat energy that would otherwise all be lost to the atmosphere is instead used to heat the water and/or air that will go into the boiler, thus saving fuel. The most successful feature of Green's design of economizer was its mechanical scraping apparatus, which was needed to keep the tubes free of deposits of soot.

Economizers were eventually fitted to virtually all stationary steam engines in the decades following Green's invention. Some preserved stationary steam engine sites still have Green's economisers although they are usually not used. One such preserved site is the Claymills Pumping Engines Trust in Staffordshire, England, which is in the process of restoring one set of economisers and the associated steam engine which drove them. Another such example is the British Engineerium in Brighton & Hove, where the economiser associated with the boilers for Number 2 Engine is in use, complete with its associated small stationary engine. A third site is Coldharbour Mill Working Wool Museum, where the Green's economiser is in working order, complete with the drive shafts from the Pollit and Wigzell steam engine.

== Power plants ==
Modern-day boilers, such as those in coal-fired power stations, are still fitted with economizers which are descendants of Green's original design. In this context they are often referred to as feedwater heaters and heat the condensate from turbines before it is pumped to the boilers.

Economizers are commonly used as part of a heat recovery steam generator (HRSG) in a combined cycle power plant. In an HRSG, water passes through an economizer, then a boiler and then a superheater. The economizer also prevents flooding of the boiler with liquid water that is too cold to be boiled, given the boiler's flow rates and design.

A common application of economizers in steam power plants is to capture the waste heat from boiler stack gases (flue gas) and transfer it to the boiler feedwater. This raises the temperature of the boiler feedwater, lowering the required energy input, in turn reducing the firing rates needed for the rated boiler output. Economizers lower stack temperatures which may cause condensation of acidic combustion gases and serious equipment corrosion damage if care is not taken in their design and material selection.

== HVAC ==
A building's HVAC (heating, ventilating, and air conditioning) system can use an air-side economizer to save energy in buildings by using cool outside air as a means of cooling the indoor space. When the temperature of the outside air is less than the temperature of the recirculated air, conditioning with the outside air is more energy efficient than conditioning with recirculated air. When the outside air is both sufficiently cool and sufficiently dry (depending on the climate) the amount of enthalpy in the air is acceptable and no additional conditioning is needed; this portion of the air-side economizer control scheme is called free cooling.

Air-side economizers can reduce HVAC energy costs in cold and temperate climates while also potentially improving indoor air quality, but are most often not appropriate in hot and humid climates. With the appropriate controls, economizers can be used in climates which experience various weather systems.

When the outside air's dry- and wet-bulb temperatures are low enough, a water-side economizer can use water cooled by a wet cooling tower or a dry cooler (also called a fluid cooler) to cool buildings without operating a chiller. They are historically known as the strainer cycle, but the water-side economizer is not a true thermodynamic cycle. Also, instead of passing the cooling tower water through a strainer and then to the cooling coils, which causes fouling, more often a plate-and-frame heat exchanger is inserted between the cooling tower and chilled water loops.

Good controls, valves or dampers, and maintenance are needed to ensure proper operation of the air- and water-side economizers.

== Refrigeration ==
=== Cooler economizer ===
A common form of refrigeration economizer is a "walk-in cooler economizer" or "outside air refrigeration system". In such a system outside air that is cooler than the air inside a refrigerated space is brought into that space and the same amount of warmer inside air is ducted outside. The resulting cooling supplements or replaces the operation of a compressor-based refrigeration system. If the air inside a cooled space is only about 5 °F warmer than the outside air that replaces it (that is, the ∆T>5 °F) this cooling effect is accomplished more efficiently than the same amount of cooling resulting from a compressor-based system. If the outside air is not cold enough to overcome the refrigeration load of the space the compressor system will need to also operate, or the temperature inside the space will rise.

=== Vapor-compression refrigeration ===
Another use of the term occurs in industrial refrigeration, specifically vapor-compression refrigeration. Normally, the economizer concept is applied when a particular design or feature on the refrigeration cycle, allows a reduction either in the amount of energy used from the power grid, in the size of the components (basically the gas compressor's nominal capacity) used to produce refrigeration, or both. For example, for a walk-in freezer that is kept at −20 °F (−29 °C), the main refrigeration components would include: an evaporator coil (a dense arrangement of pipes containing refrigerant and thin metal fins used to remove heat from inside the freezer), fans to blow air over the coil and around the box, an air-cooled condensing unit sited outdoors, and valves and piping. The condensing unit would include a compressor and a coil and fans to exchange heat with the ambient air.

An economizer display takes advantage of the fact that refrigeration systems have increasing efficiencies at increasing pressures and temperatures. The power the gas compressor needs is strongly correlated to both the ratio and the difference between the discharge and the suction pressures (as well as to other features like the refrigerant's heat capacity and the type of compressor). Low-temperature systems such as freezers move less fluid in the same volumes. That means the compressor's pumping is less efficient on low-temperature systems. This phenomenon is notorious when taking into account that the evaporation temperature for a walk-in freezer at −20 °F (−29 °C) may be around −35 °F (−37 °C). Systems with economizers aim to produce part of the refrigeration work on high pressures, a condition in which gas compressors are normally more efficient. Depending on the application, this technology either allows smaller compression capacities to be able to supply enough pressure and flow for a system that normally would require bigger compressors, increases the capacity of a system that without an economizer would produce less refrigeration, or allows the system to produce the same amount of refrigeration using less power.

The economizer concept is linked to subcooling as the condensed liquid line temperature is usually higher than that of the evaporator, making it a good place to apply the notion of increasing efficiencies. Recalling the walk-in freezer example, the normal temperature of the liquid line in that system is around 60 °F (16 °C) or even higher (it varies depending on the condensing temperature). That condition is by far less hostile to producing refrigeration than the evaporator at −35 °F (−37 °C).

=== Economizer setups in refrigeration ===
Several configurations of the refrigeration cycle incorporate an economizer and benefit from it. The design of these systems requires expertise and extra components. Pressure drop, electronic valve control, and oil drag must all be considered.

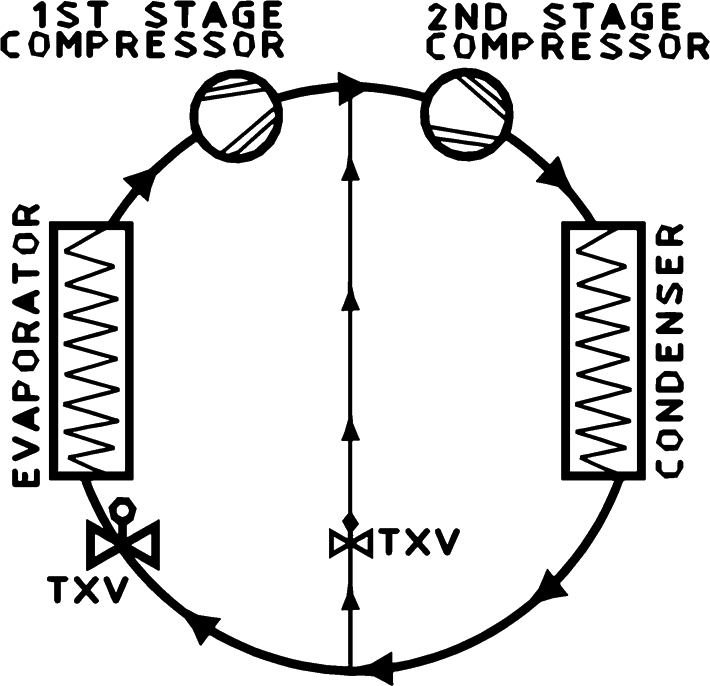
Two-stage systems may need to double the pressure handlers installed in the cycle. The diagram displays two different thermal expansion valves (TXV) and two separate stages of gas compression.

==== Two staged systems and boosters ====
A system is said to be a two-stage set-up if two gas compressors work together in series to produce the compression. A normal booster installation is a two-stage system that receives fluid to cool the discharge of the first compressor before it is input to the second compressor. The fluid that arrives at the interstage of both compressors comes from the liquid line and is normally controlled by expansion, pressure and solenoid valves.

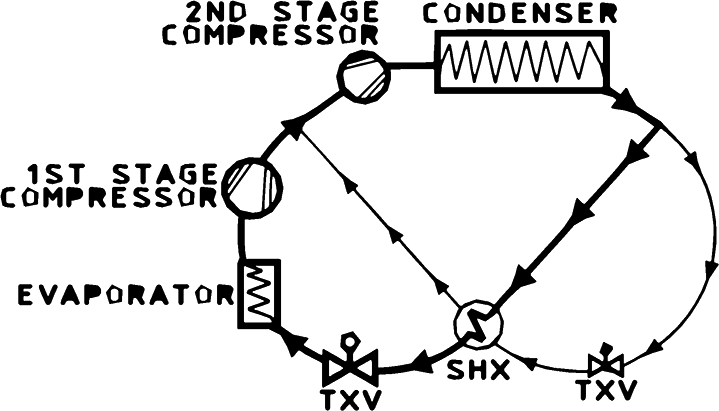
A subcooled booster has a subcooling heat exchanger (SHX) that provides subcooling for the condensed liquid line.

A standard two-stage cycle of this kind has an expansion valve that expands and modulates the amount of refrigerant incoming at the interstage. As the fluid arriving at the interstage expands, it will tend to evaporate, producing a temperature drop and cooling the second compressor's suction when mixed with the fluid discharged by the first compressor. This kind of set-up may have a heat exchanger between the expansion and the interstage, which may be a second evaporator to produce an additional refrigeration effect, though not as cool as the main evaporator (for example to produce air conditioning or for keeping fresh products). A two-stage system is said to be set up as a booster with subcooling if the refrigerant arriving at the interstage passes through a subcooling heat exchanger that subcools the main liquid line arriving at the main evaporator of the same system.

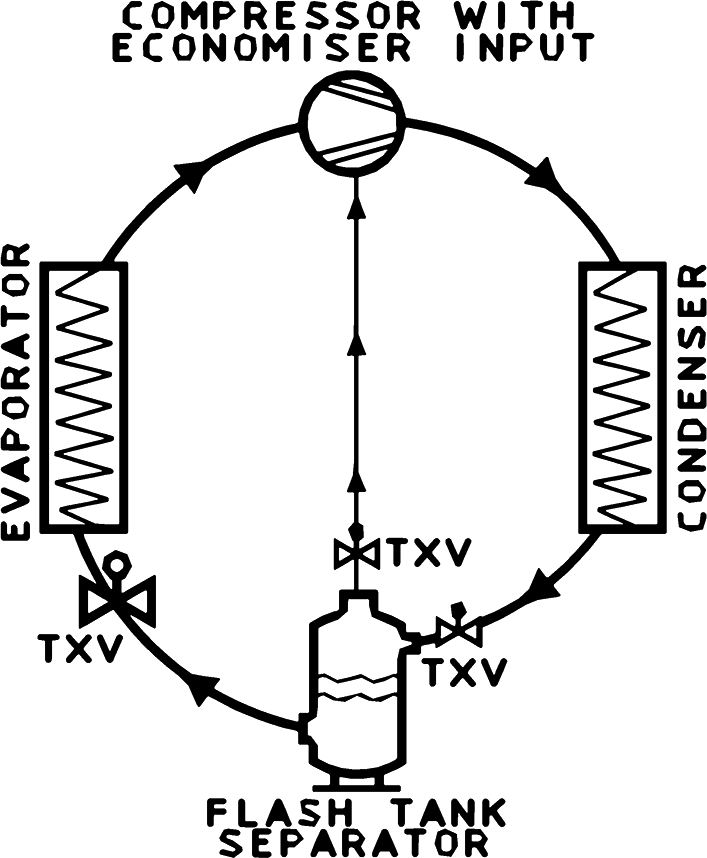
Some screw compressor manufacturers offer them with economizer. These systems can use flash-gas for the economizer input.

==== Economizer gas compressors ====
The need to use two compressors in a booster set-up tends to increase the cost of a refrigeration system. A two-stage system also needs synchronization, pressure control and lubrication. To reduce these costs, specialized equipment has been developed.

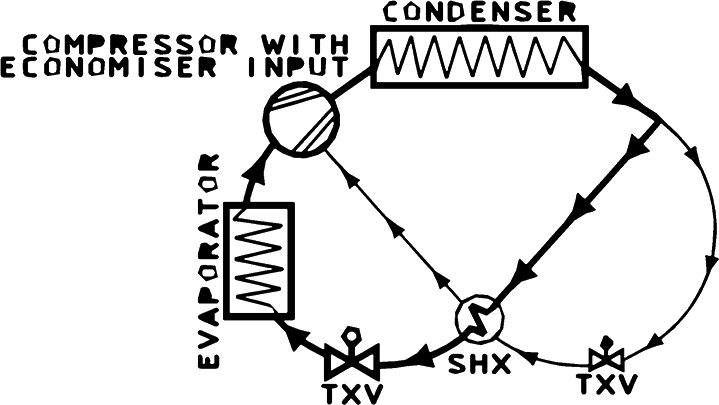
A subcooled economizer reduces the amount of gas compressors in the system.

Economizer screw compressors are built by several manufacturers like Refcomp, Mycom, Bitzer and York. These machines merge both compressors of a two-stage system into one screw compressor with two inputs: the main suction and an interstage side entrance for higher-pressure gas. This means there is no need to install two compressors and still benefit from the booster concept.

There are two types of economizer setups for these compressors, flash and subcooling. The latter works like a two-stage booster with subcooling. The flash economizer differs because it doesn't use a heat exchanger to produce subcooling. Instead, it has a flash chamber or tank, in which flash gas is produced to lower the temperature of the liquid before the expansion. The flash gas that is produced in this tank leaves the liquid line and goes to the economizer entrance of the screw compressor.

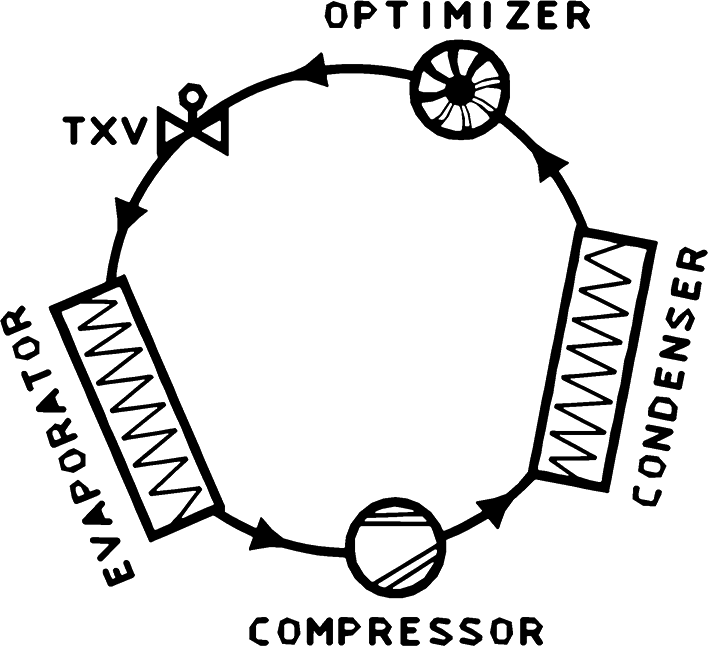
Refrigeration cycle optimizers such as EcoPac's E-Series keep the original design of the refrigeration cycle without modification.

==== Subcooling and refrigeration cycle optimizers ====
The above systems produce an economizer effect by using compressors, meters, valves and heat exchangers within the refrigeration cycle. In some refrigeration systems the economizer can be an independent refrigeration mechanism. Such is the case of subcooling the liquid line by any other means that draws the heat out of the main system. For example, a heat exchanger that preheats cold water needed for another process or human use, may take heat from the liquid line, effectively subcooling it and increasing the system's capacity.

Recently, machines exclusively designed for this purpose have been developed. In Chile, the manufacturer EcoPac Systems developed a cycle optimizer that can stabilize the temperature of the liquid line and allow either an increase in the refrigeration capacity of the system or a reduction of the power consumption. Such systems have the advantage of not interfering with the original design of the refrigeration system and are a way to expand a single staged system that does not possess an economizer compressor.

==== Internal heat exchangers ====
Subcooling may also be produced by superheating the gas leaving the evaporator and heading to the gas compressor. These systems withdraw heat from the liquid line and heat the gas compressor's suction line. This is a very common solution to ensure that gas reaches the compressor and liquid reaches the valve. It also allows maximum heat exchanger use as it minimizes the portion of the heat exchangers used to change the temperature of the fluid, and maximizes the volume in which the refrigerant changes its phase (phenomena involving much more heat flow, the base principle of vapor-compression refrigeration).

An internal heat exchanger is simply a heat exchanger that uses the cold gas leaving the evaporator coil to cool the high-pressure liquid that is headed into the beginning of the evaporator coil via an expansion device. The gas is used to chill a chamber that normally has a series of pipes for the liquid running through it. The superheated gas then proceeds on to the compressor. The subcooling term refers to cooling the liquid below its boiling point. 10 °F (5.6 °C) of subcooling means it is 10 °F colder than boiling at a given pressure. As it represents a temperature difference, the subcooling value is not measured on an absolute temperature scale, only on a relative scale as a temperature difference.

== See also ==
- Countercurrent exchange
- Regenerative heat exchanger
- Feedwater heater
- Thermal efficiency
