= Subcooling =

Liquids below boiling point

The term subcooling (also called undercooling) refers to the intentional process of cooling a liquid below its normal boiling point. For example, water boils at 373 K; at room temperature (293 K) liquid water is termed "subcooled". Subcooling is a common stage in refrigeration cycles and steam turbine cycles. Some rocket engines use subcooled propellants.

In refrigeration systems, subcooling the refrigerant is necessary to ensure the completion of the remaining stages of the refrigeration cycle. The subcooling stage provides certainty that the refrigerant is fully liquid before it reaches the next step on the cycle, the thermal expansion valve, where the presence of gas can be disruptive. Subcooling is often accomplished in heat exchangers.

Subcooling and superheating, which are similar and inverse processes, are both important for the stability and well-functioning of a refrigeration system.

== Applications ==
=== Expansion valve operation and compressor safety ===
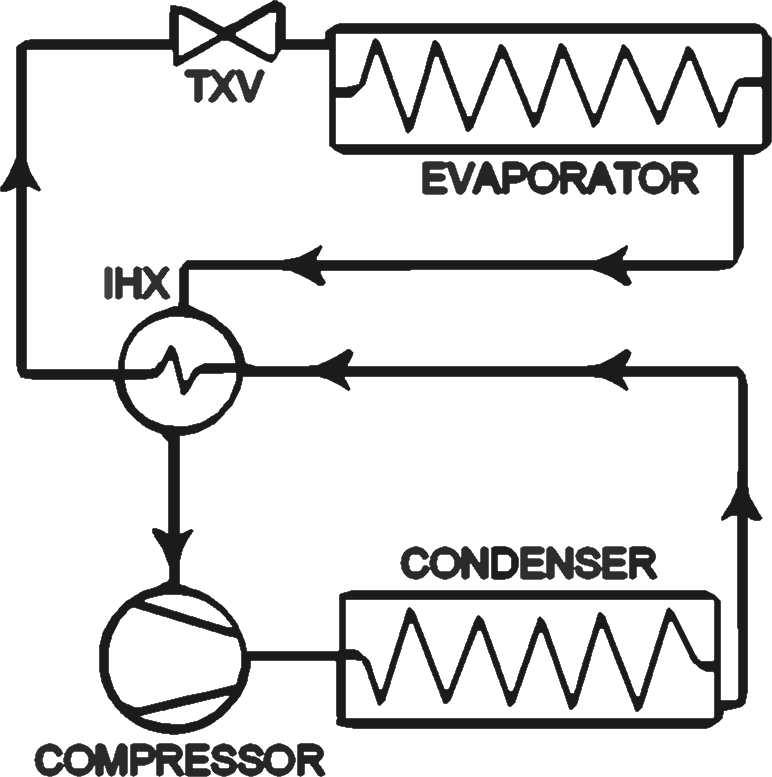
A small diagram of a refrigeration system with mechanical subcooling and superheating coupled by an internal heat exchanger (IHX)

Subcooling is normally used so that when the refrigerant reaches the thermostatic expansion valve, all of it is in its liquid form, thus allowing the valve to work properly. If gas reaches the expansion valve, a series of unwanted phenomena may occur. These may end up leading to behaviors similar to those observed with the flash-gas phenomena: problems in oil regulation throughout the cycle; excessive and unnecessary misuse of power and waste of electricity; malfunction and deterioration of several components in the installation; irregular performance of the overall system and, if unmonitored, ruined equipment.

Another important and common application of subcooling is its indirect use on the superheating process. Superheating is analogous to subcooling in an operative way, i.e., occurring prior to a stage where refrigerant in a liquid-gas state would disrupt the cycle (uncompressible liquid-gas mixtures will destroy the compressor) and both processes can be coupled using an internal heat exchanger. Subcooling then is accomplished simultaneously with superheating, allowing heat to flow from subcooling refrigerant at higher pressure (liquid) to superheating refrigerant at lower pressure (gas). This creates an energetic equivalence between the subcooling and the superheating phenomena where there is little or no energy loss. Normally, the fluid that is being subcooled is hotter than the refrigerant that is being superheated, allowing an energy flux in the needed direction. Thus, subcooling is an easy and widespread source of heat for the superheating process.

=== System optimization and energy saving ===
Allowing the subcooling process to occur outside the condenser (as with an internal heat exchanger) is a method of using all of the condensing device's heat exchanging capacity. A huge portion of refrigeration systems use part of the condenser for subcooling which, though very effective and simple, may be considered a diminishing factor in the nominal condensing capacity. A similar situation may be found with superheating taking place in the evaporator, thus an internal heat exchanger is a good and relatively cheap solution for the maximization of heat exchanging capacity.

Another widespread application of subcooling is boosting and economising. Inversely to superheating, subcooling, or the amount of heat withdrawn from the liquid refrigerant on the subcooling process, manifests itself as an increase on the refrigeration capacity of the system. This means that any extra heat removal after the condensation (subcooling) allows a higher ratio of heat absorption on further stages of the cycle. Superheating has exactly the inverse effect. An internal heat exchanger alone is not able to increase the capacity of the system because the boosting effect of subcooling is dimmed by the superheating, making the net capacity gain equal to zero. Some systems are able to move refrigerant and/or to remove heat using less energy because they do so on high pressure fluids that later cool or subcool lower pressure (which are more difficult to cool) fluids.

=== In spaceflight ===
In spaceflight applications, subcooling refers to cryogenic fuels or oxidizers which are cooled well below their boiling point (but not below the melting point). This results in higher propellant density and, hence, higher propellant tank capacity and reduced vaporization losses.

SpaceX's Falcon 9 and Starship launch vehicles employ subcooling for propellants. Superchilling is another term used for this technique.

== Natural and artificial subcooling ==
The subcooling process can happen in many different ways; therefore, it is possible to distinguish between the different parts in which the process takes places. Normally, subcooling refers to the magnitude of the temperature drop which is easily measurable, but it is possible to speak of subcooling in terms of the total heat being removed. The most commonly known subcooling is the condenser subcooling, which is usually known as the total temperature drop that takes place inside the condenser, immediately after the fluid has totally condensed, until it leaves the condensing unit.

Condenser subcooling differs from total subcooling usually because after the condenser, throughout the piping, the refrigerant may naturally tend to cool even more, before it arrives to the expansion valve, but also because of artificial subcooling. The total subcooling is the complete temperature drop the refrigerant undergoes from its actual condensing temperature, to the concrete temperature it has when reaching the expansion valve: this is the effective subcooling.

Natural subcooling is the name normally given to the temperature drop produced inside the condenser (condenser subcooling), combined with the temperature drop happening through the pipeline alone, excluding any heat exchangers of any kind. When there is no mechanical subcooling (i.e. an internal heat exchanger), natural subcooling should equal total subcooling. On the other hand, mechanical subcooling is the temperature reduced by any artificial process that is deliberately placed to create subcooling. This concept refers mainly to devices such as internal heat exchangers, independent subcooling cascades, economisers or boosters.

== Economizer and energy efficiency ==
Subcooling is a key factor in improving the efficiency of refrigeration systems, which has led to extensive research. Systems that operate at higher pressures tend to be more efficient, and compressors used in subcooling loops are generally more efficient than those that cool the liquid refrigerant directly.

Modern economizer-capable screw compressors are being developed, requiring advanced manufacturing techniques. These compressors can inject refrigerant from an internal heat exchanger, rather than the main evaporator, into the final stage of the compression process. In this setup, the refrigerant liquid is subcooled at high pressure in the heat exchanger, a process known as mechanical subcooling. Booster systems are another approach, where one compressor operates at higher pressures and greater efficiency, while another handles lower pressures. Unlike booster systems, economizers achieve subcooling with a single compressor designed for economizing.

Cascade subcooling systems offer yet another method, using a separate refrigeration system to subcool the refrigerant. While effective, these systems are costly and complex, requiring dedicated compressors and additional equipment. Despite this, they are of interest due to their potential benefits. The United States Department of Energy has recognized refrigerant subcooling as a reliable way to improve system performance and save energy in a Federal Technology Alert. However, separating the subcooling unit from the main system remains economically challenging, as it requires sophisticated and expensive control systems to monitor fluid conditions.

Recently, a product developed in Chile has introduced mechanical subcooling to general refrigeration systems, demonstrating the ability to boost system capacity.

The principle behind subcooling is straightforward: the extra cooling provided by subcooling directly increases the refrigerant’s efficiency, while superheating reduces it. Compressors involved in subcooling operate under better conditions—at higher pressures—making the cooling process more efficient. This makes the heat removed during subcooling more energy-efficient and cost-effective compared to the heat removed by the main system.

== Transcritical carbon dioxide systems ==
In a typical refrigeration system, the refrigerant transitions between gas and liquid states. This involves superheating and subcooling, as the gas must be cooled to condense into a liquid, and the liquid must be heated to evaporate back into a gas. It is nearly impossible to avoid slight undercooling or overheating during this process, making superheating and subcooling inherent and unavoidable in conventional vapor-compression refrigeration systems.

In contrast, transcritical systems introduce a different phase of matter for the refrigerant during the cycle. Specifically, the refrigerant (commonly carbon dioxide) does not undergo a standard condensation process. Instead, it passes through a gas cooler in a supercritical phase. Under these conditions, the concepts of condensation temperature and subcooling are not entirely applicable.

Significant research is being conducted on this topic, focusing on multi-stage processes, ejectors, expanders, and various other devices and enhancements. Gustav Lorentzen proposed modifications to the cycle, including two-stage internal subcooling, for these systems.

== See also ==
- Carbon dioxide
- Condensation
- Condenser
- Economizer
- Evaporation
- Gustav Lorentzen
- Evaporator
- Heat transfer
- List of refrigerants
- Refrigerant
- Refrigeration cycle
- Screw compressors
- Superheated water
- Thermal expansion valve
- Thermodynamics
- Vapor-compression refrigeration
