= Multi-Evaporator System =

Refrigeration system

A multi-evaporator system is a vapor-compression refrigeration system generally consisting of four major components:

1. Evaporator
2. Compressor
3. Condenser
4. Thermal expansion valve

Sometimes in a refrigerator several loads are varied. Refrigerators used to function at different loads operated under different condition of temperatures and pressures. There may be arrangements possible for multi evaporators on the basis of single or multi compressors. If refrigerant from each evaporator compressed in the same single compressor then it is called as Multi-evaporator single-compressor system.

== Single compressor-individual expansion valve ==
A two evaporator single compressor with individual expansion valves for each evaporator after passing through the back pressure valve enters into the compressors and hence there is a significant rise in temperature is observed. This system helps in dropping the pressure from high pressure evaporators with the help of back pressure valves. The high pressure ratio is obtained which necessarily compresses the vapor to high extent from the higher temperature evaporators to condenser temperature. This kind of refrigerator has greater application in load varying purpose. Moreover, high value of COP and better operating economy is observed.

Mass flow rate through evaporators :-

m_{1}=Heat through evaporator 1(Q_{1})÷(specific enthalpy difference in evaporator 1)

m_{2}=Heat through evaporator 1(Q_{2})÷(specific enthalpy difference in evaporator 2))

The net work done is :-

- W = (Sum of masses through evaporator 1 and evaporator 2)*(specific enthalpy difference in compressor)
- W = (m_{1}+m_{2})*(h_{2}-h_{1})
