= Flash-gas (refrigeration) =

In refrigeration, flash-gas is refrigerant in gas form produced spontaneously when the condensed liquid is subjected to boiling. The presence of flash-gas in the liquid lines reduces the efficiency of the refrigeration cycle. It can also lead several expansion systems to work improperly, and increase superheating at the evaporator. This is normally perceived as an unwanted condition caused by dissociation between the volume of the system, and the pressures and temperatures that allow the refrigerant to be liquid. Flash-gas must not be confused with lack of condensation, but special gear such as receivers, internal heat exchangers, insulation, and refrigeration cycle optimizers may improve condensation and avoid gas in the liquid lines.

== Common Causes ==
=== Heat absorption and pressure loss ===
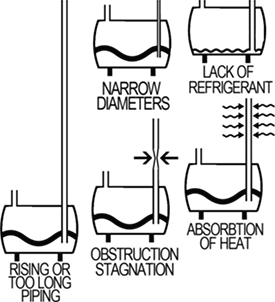
A small illustration of some of the most usual causes of the production of flash-gas.

The most common causes driving the fluid to change its phase when in the liquid line are excessive length of the pipeline, small diameter of the pipelines, and a lack of subcooling. These create low pressure loci that may cause the fluid to begin changing its phase, especially if the pipeline is exposed to heat, through, for example, gaps in insulation. If there is inadequate subcooling, the refrigerant remains in thermodynamic conditions close to saturation, promoting flash-gas formation.

Heat may be absorbed not only from external sources, but from internal energy sources such as friction in the pipeline. On the other hand, pressure in the liquid line may also be upset by artefacts and conditions including excessive vertical rise in the liquid line, gear too small for the size of the piping, devices pumping refrigerant through the line, and any obstructions, all of which cause differences in pressure throughout the liquid line. Eventually, heat absorption and pressure losses in the liquid line modify the saturation conditions of the refrigerant to such an extent that the refrigerant boils and produces flash-gas.

=== Quality and amount of refrigerant ===
Refrigerant may also explain flash-gas occurrence. When a system lacks refrigerant, or has a leakage, it may exhibit flash-gas as the volume in the piping exceeds the capacity of the refrigerant to fill it as liquid. This may force the refrigerant into a phase change. On the other hand, lack of refrigerant can sometimes also produce the opposite effect: an overall increase on the subcooling (and superheating) which will depend on the size and design of the system and its piping. If the system's refrigerant is degenerate, flash-gas may also be produced, as physical properties of the fluid change. This happens because the piping is designed for a specific refrigerant mixture that allows liquid in the liquid line, given certain thermodynamic conditions. If the refrigerant mixture changes its composition considerably, the original designs will not be adequate. Degenerated refrigerant produced by leakage, chemical decomposition or loading with gas when using a glided refrigerant, will most likely make the system perform very poorly, alter the lubricating oil's circulation or composition, and may eventually render the equipment inoperative.

=== Gas production after expansion ===
It is also common to find that refrigerant begins to evaporate immediately after the expansion valve, before arriving to the evaporator. This may also be considered as flash-gas but normally doesn't produce complications in the refrigeration cycle. Many refrigeration systems have the expansion valve set up inside the room being cooled, consequently generating productive refrigeration if absorbing heat from the room, to produce this kind of flash-gas between the expansion and the evaporator. Besides, the expansion valve deregulates its operation if the fluid arriving to it is boiling. In this case, the boiling occurs after the expansion.

== Detection ==
Flash-gas may be detected in the system by the observation of gas, bubbles or a foamy appearance of the liquid in the viewing glass in the liquid line. Depending on the location of the glass, this may also indicate an overwhelmed condenser, and the lack of these indicators at the glass does not definitely rule out flash-gas formation in the liquid line.

Considering the saturation table for the refrigerant, if it is possible to confirm that a certain amount of condenser subcooling is being produced, and the glass still exhibits gas in the liquid line, one may identify this with flash-gas being produced between the condenser and the glass. The flash-gas phenomena may create a deceiving temperature drop on the liquid line that can be misinterpreted as subcooling. This is due to the fact that the refrigerant may use part of the heat obtained from lowering its temperature, to finish vaporizing itself to be able to occupy the volume of the pipes at those pressures.

== Prevention ==
Efforts to prevent flash-gas in the liquid line include a cautious design of the cooling system and its piping, but also the incorporation of gear that might help solve this type of difficulty. The inclusion of a refrigerant receiver is a common, cheap and simple way of decreasing the gas ratio in the liquid line. The incorporation of a subcooling stage after the receiver reduces even more the chances to observe flash gas. This subcooling may be done in a reserved portion of the main condenser, or separately with a heat exchanger. Some receivers may incorporate an internal heat exchanger that draws heat form the subcooled liquid to superheat the gas compressors suction. There are also many kinds of independent subcooling displays and applications such as refrigeration cycle optimizers; these help avoiding flash-gas in the liquid line by lowering the temperature away from the refrigerant's saturation curves. Some systems deal with flash-gas by separating it from the refrigerant that goes to the evaporator, as that portion of the refrigerant already evaporated and will only increase superheating.

One key feature when preventing flash-gas is the diameter of the piping. If the pipes are too thin and long, loss of pressure and friction tend to occur. If the evaporator is too high above the receiver, the rising pipes produce a small amount of vacuum at the topmost portion, making the fluid to undergo ebullition and produce flash-gas. On the contrary, a refrigerant column that creates weight and pressure may reduce the chances of finding flash-gas. If the evaporator is a plate exchanger placed below the level of the receiver, the pressure will not allow the refrigerant to boil easily.

Insulating the liquid line can be helpful if one can determine that heat is being absorbed throughout the piping. On the contrary, if the liquid in the liquid line is hotter than the air outside, insulating the pipes on that section might increase flash-gas as natural subcooling is partially decreased.

=== Effects on the rest of the system ===
When preventing flash gas, one must take into account all the other features of the system and how they are affected. Increasing the pipeline diameter may have incidence on the oil circulation and affect the gas compressor. A column of refrigerant creating weight pressure in the liquid line can be a solution for flash-gas, but may have incidence in the expansion and evaporation. If the evaporator floods and liquid arrives to the gas compressor, serious complications will show up, most likely destroying the compressor (especially if the compressor is below the level of the receiver).

== Effects of Flash-Gas ==
The main effect of the presence flash-gas in the liquid piping is the net loss of refrigeration capacity. In general terms this is produced in two ways. First, the expansion valve usually doesn't work properly if injecting a gas-liquid mixture such as refrigerant with flash-gas presence. Second, a portion of the heat required for the refrigerant to flash into gaseous form is drawn from mechanical work such as pressure imbued by the gas compressor that moves the refrigerant.

Both, lack of evaporation, and untimed transformations of energy from work to heat: increase the pressures and temperatures along the pipes; decrease the thermodynamic reversibility of the process, and raise the overall magnitude of entropy produced throughout the whole cycle. This means the refrigeration efficiency of the cycle worsens as it moves away from Carnot's theoretical ideal efficiency. A loss of performance implies that the system uses more energy to produce less refrigeration. Besides, these kinds of efficiency losses not only underutilize gear, but may end up lowering the operative life of the main components, especially the expansion valve and the gas compressor.

== See also ==
- Flash-gas (petroleum)
- Heat transfer
- Subcooling
- Superheating
- Evaporation
- Condenser
- Screw compressors
- Entropy
- Heat Engine
- Carnot's Efficiency
- Thermal expansion valve
- Refrigeration cycle
- Vapor-compression refrigeration
- Evaporator
- Condensation
- Thermodynamics
- Sadi Carnot
