= Flash-gas (petroleum) =

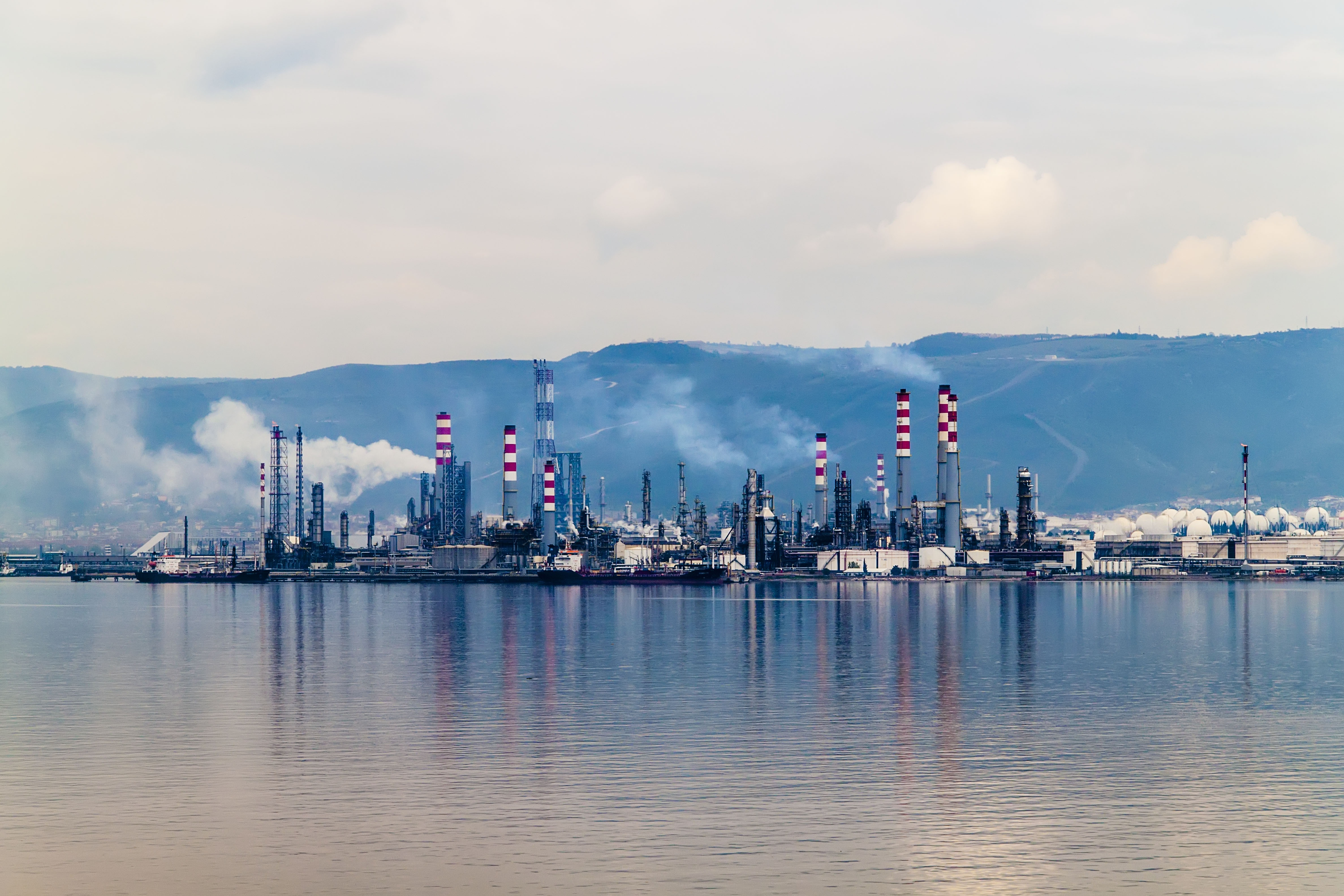
Oil and Natural Gas Refinery in Turkey

In an oil and gas production, flash-gas is a spontaneous vapor that is produced from the heating or depressurization of the extracted oil mixture during different phases of production. Flash evaporation, or flashing, is the process of volatile components suddenly vaporizing from their liquid state. This often happens during the transportation of petroleum products through pipelines and into vessels, such as when the stream from a common separation unit flows into an on-site atmospheric storage tank. Vessels that are used to intentionally "flash" a mixture of gas and saturated liquids are aptly named "flash drums." A type of vapor-liquid separator. A venting apparatus is used in these vessels to prevent damage due to increasing pressure, extreme cases of this are referred to as boiling liquid expanding vapor explosion (BLEVE).

The composition of the gas that is flashed is dependent on many factors, therefore it is suggested that all extractions be analyzed to determine accurate compositional values. As a generality, this definition applies to the nature of flashing hydrocarbons (HC) that make up oil and natural gas, "If the saturated liquid is a multi-component liquid (for example, a mixture of propane, isobutane and normal butane), the flashed vapor is richer in the more volatile components than is the remaining liquid". Although the flashed portion will be primarily components with higher volatilities (lighter HC), heavier HC will also flash into the vapor phase to some extent. Composition of flash gas is highly dependent on temperature and pressure and can therefore be manipulated using these control variables to become a usable resource (natural gas, natural gas liquids (NGL's), alternative fuels, etc.) if proper infrastructure and sponsorship is in place.

The production of flash-gas and its release into the atmosphere, via venting and improper handling during production, is of concern to environmental efforts due to the presence of Hazardous Air Pollutants (HAP), Greenhouse Gases (GHG), and Volatile Organic Compounds (VOC) which have been suggested to have harmful long-term environmental impacts. Various efforts by organizations around the world have been made to develop appropriate guidelines for handling flash gas as well as tools for evaluating flash emissions through model based calculations.

== Natural Gas Liquids/Liquid Petroleum Gas ==
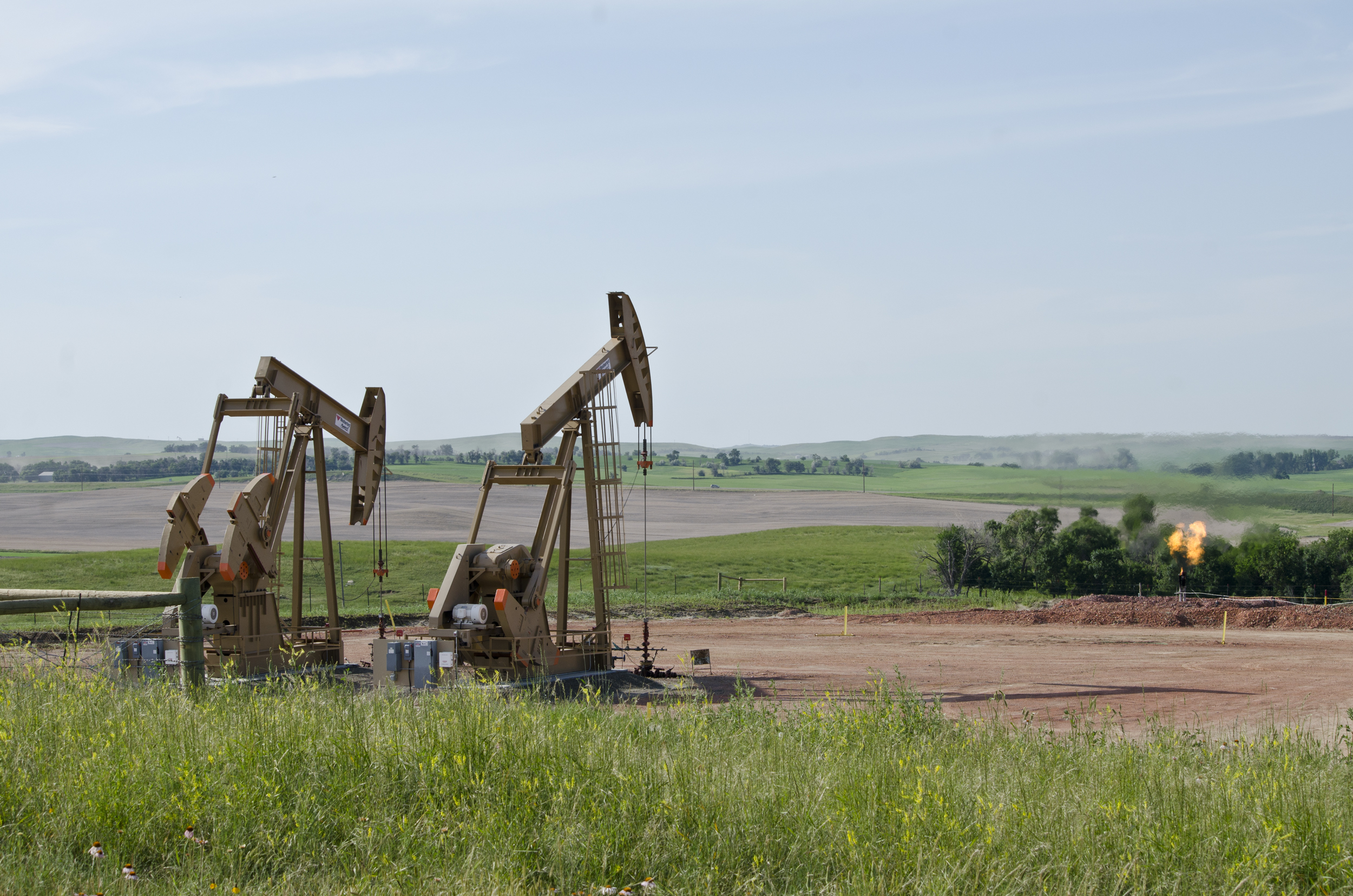
Pumpjacks operating in North Dakota with a flare unit.

Natural gas liquids (NGL) are the fraction of the hydrocarbons, primarily having 2-8 carbon atoms, that are present in the flash gas during oil production or as liquids in natural gas production. In other words, NGL is the liquids removed from natural gas such as ethane and heavier products. Components of NGL's have varying states during production, meaning that some will exist solely as a liquid or vapor, and some will be a mixture of the two depending on the current temperature and pressure. Therefore, it is necessary that components of NGL are distinguished as either natural-gas condensate, heavier components (C5+), or "other NGL", lighter components that typically remain in the vapor phase during production. NGL is not to be confused with its subcategory LPG, liquefied petroleum gas, described as "hydrocarbon mixtures in which the main components are propane, iso and normal butane, propylene and butylenes."

Capturing NGL's has shown an uptick in their economic share of U.S. production levels the past few years, sparking interest for advancement in recovery techniques for petroleum extraction. Uses of NGLs vary, from other combustible fuels like autogas and natural gasoline, to the manufacturing of plastics. The apparent value of these materials has put the level of products developed from NGLs at an all-time high in the United States in 2015. Despite its value and use, many of the components that make up NGL and LPG become considered "waste gas" during production and are flared on-site or vented into the atmosphere as flash gas. This can be due to a lack of infrastructure to capture and store and/or transport these liquids to market. Profitability under current models is highly dependent on the access to pipeline infrastructure, gas volume produced, and the number of/distance between production facilities (batteries).

== Environmental Concerns ==
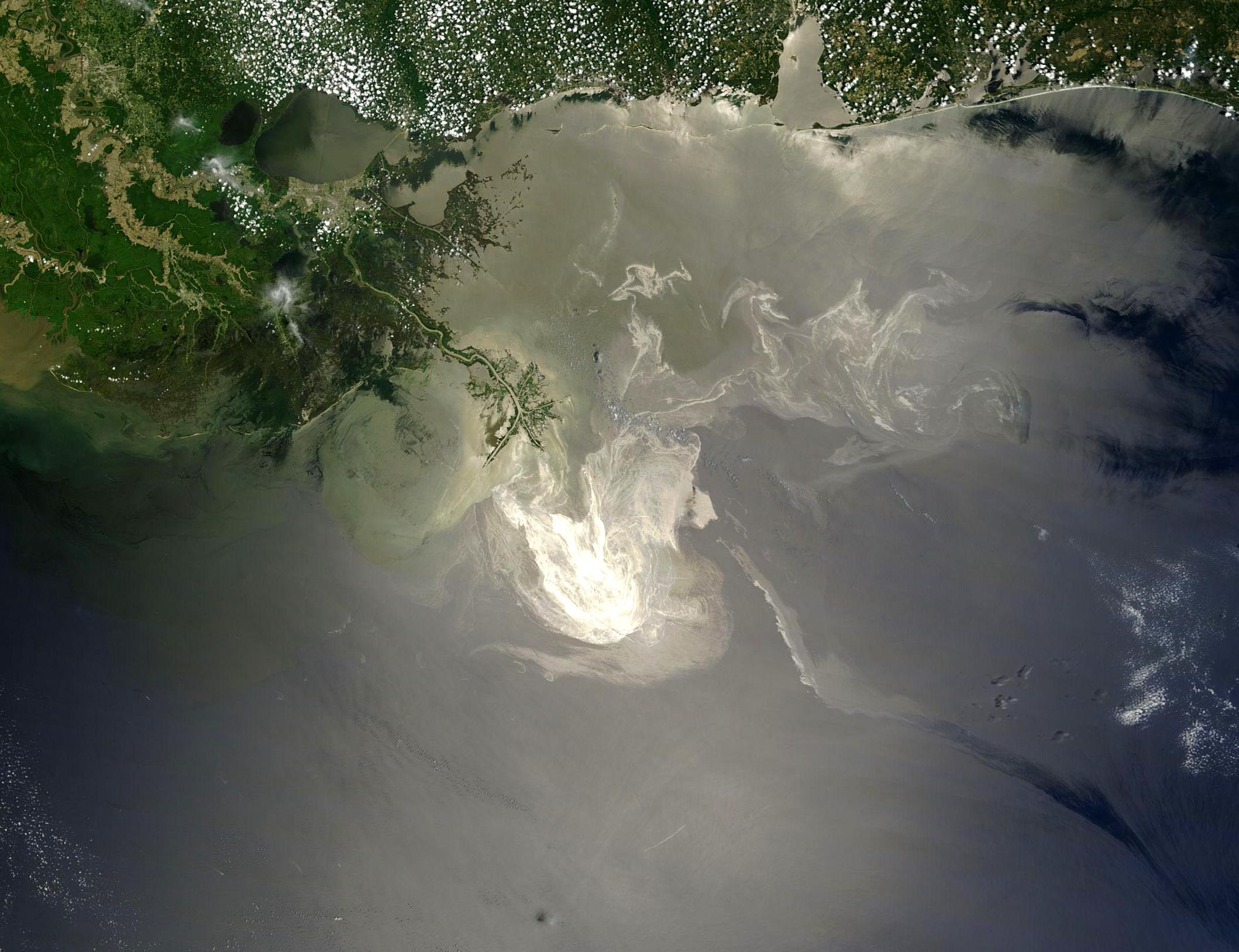
Deepwater Horizon oil spill as seen by NASA's Terra Satellites on May 24 via a Moderate-Resolution Imaging Spectroradiometer.

Flash gas is the emissions from flash evaporation, breathing emissions, and working emissions. Breathing, or standing emissions, occur naturally as liquid sits in a vessel and undergoes normal evaporation into the atmosphere. Working emissions are created when the liquid is agitated, such as during transportation, emptying/filling of tanks, sampling, etc. Contained within all of these emissions are materials that have been deemed hazardous to humans and the environment by regulatory agencies and scientific bodies worldwide. The complex nature of chemical interactions in flare, flash, and other production vapors have spawned many efforts to describe and control how these hydrocarbons interact with other materials in the atmosphere to create air pollution. The study of these interactions is encompassed by the field of atmospheric chemistry.

=== Hazardous Air Pollutants (HAP) ===
The environmental impact of emissions can be quantified in terms of the amount of hazardous air pollutants (HAP) they contain. HAPs, also known as toxic air contaminants, are defined by the EPA as "those known to cause cancer and other serious health impacts". In the United States, legislation known as the Clean Air Act mandated the EPA to regulate appropriate levels of HAP emissions from source categories such as industrial and mobile.

There are currently 187 different chemical compounds that are classified as HAP which are declared in the National Emissions Standards for Hazardous Air Pollutants (NESHAP). Oil and natural gas production is known as a stationary source and is therefore required by the Clean Air Act to follow guidelines put forth by NESHAP, New Source Performance Standards (NSPS), and Control Techniques Guidelines to reduce the amount of emissions the industry produces.

The EPA, as of 2015, has public record of two [2005/2011] National Air Toxics Assessments (NATA) which present the effects of air toxic emissions on a national-scale. In addition to identifying and prioritizing air toxins, the assessment determines specific locations that are at risk so that corrective measures may be implemented. Reports also go into detail about potential cancers and health problems associated with the level of reported toxins.

=== Greenhouse Gases (GHG) ===
Greenhouse gases are classified by their ability to absorb and emit radiation energy in atmosphere. This process of energy capture and release is what allows for the greenhouse effect, when energy trapped within the gas causes a resulting warming of the atmospheric temperature. Greenhouse gases are necessary for keeping our atmosphere warm enough to sustain life but also serve as a medium for over-heating to occur, a phenomenon referred to as global warming. GHGs are produced both directly and indirectly during many production phases of the oil and gas industry.

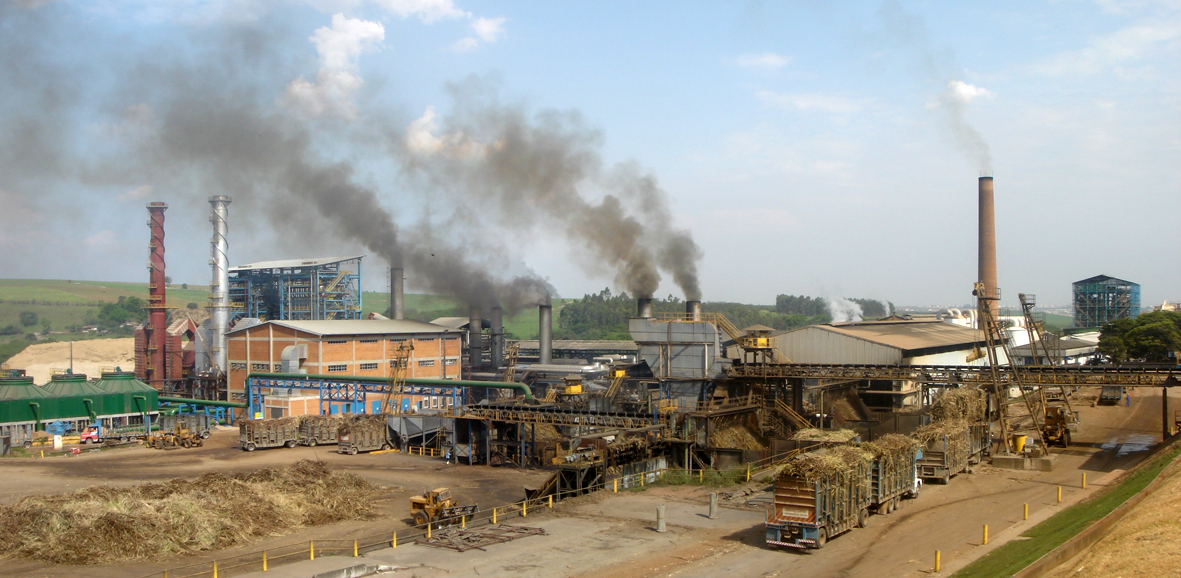
The Costa Pinto Production Plant in Piracicaba, Brazil. Processing of carbon-rich sugarcane provides sugar, ethanol fuel, industrial grade ethanol, and alcohol for beverages, but also produces harmful emissions.

It is estimated that 90% of GHG emissions from fossil fuels is due to its combustion. As of 2009, energy-related CO_{2} emissions made up more than 80% of total U.S. greenhouse gas emissions. Flare and flash gas both contain GHGs and therefore contribute to their release into the atmosphere, estimates of their emission levels during petroleum production vary due to largely unmeasured release of flash gas and other forms of fugitive emissions.

One study estimated a 40% increase in the atmospheric concentration of the GHG carbon dioxide (CO_{2}) is due directly to human activities since 1750. GHGs other than CO_{2} which are produced during petroleum operations are also a concern to the environment. On average, 43.6% of waste gas from a typical plant is methane. Methane has 28-36 times the amount of global warming potential (GWP) as CO_{2} because of its ability to absorb more radiation energy. Nitrous oxide has a GWP of 265-298 times that of CO_{2} and is known to also be released during flaring and combustion of fossil fuels.

=== Volatile Organic Compounds (VOC) ===
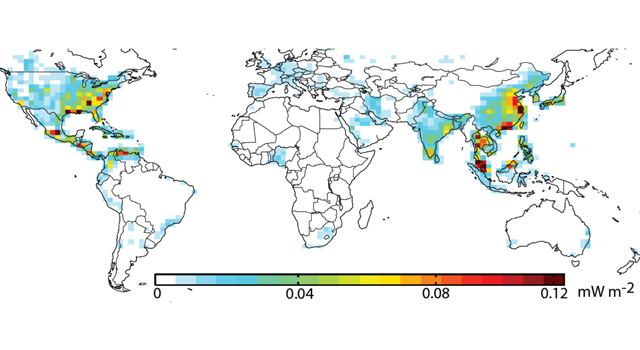
Contributions of nitrogen dioxide emissions - the primary source of ozone- to the global average thermal absorption of ozone as observed by the Tropospheric Emission Spectrometer instrument on NASA's Aura spacecraft in Aug. 2006. High values (red) indicate that emissions in that location contribute more strongly to the trapping of heat in the Earth's atmosphere relative to other locations.

Volatile organic compounds (VOCs) are organic chemicals, some of which occur naturally in oil and gas, that have high vapor pressure at ordinary room temperature. As a result, these chemicals exhibit an ease of transition from the liquid to the vapor state under atmospheric (ambient) conditions. In general chemistry terms, VOCs are organic molecules with low molecular weights, boiling points below 200 ˚C, and low to medium solubility in water. The EPA defines VOC's as, "Any compound of carbon, excluding carbon monoxide, carbon dioxide, carbonic acid, metallic carbides or carbonates and ammonium carbonate, which participates is atmospheric photochemical reactions, except those designated by the EPA as having negligible photochemical reactivity."

In 1977, the EPA released "Recommended Policy on Control of Volatile Organic Compounds" in which they separated VOCs based on three criteria: photochemical reactivity, role in stratospheric O_{3} depletion, and direct health effects. The Safe Drinking Water act lays out guidelines for levels of hazardous materials, including some VOCs, that are acceptable in the water of the United States. VOCs are hazardous to the environment due to their ability to form ground level ozone or smog through photochemical reactions. As well as contributing to indoor pollutants, VOCs are also known to have "respiratory, allergic, or immune effects in infants and children". There are concerns that these compounds can be cancer causing in both humans and animals. In particular, exposure to the VOC benzene during crude oil production could pose potentially serious health risks to workers.

==== Photochemical Reactions ====
Much of the negative impact associated with VOCs stems from their ability to participate in photochemical reactions with primary pollutants (NO_{x}) in the atmosphere. Photochemical reactions are defined as, "a chemical reaction initiated by the absorption of energy in the form of light". These reactions often result in the production of photo-chemical oxidants, such as nitrogen dioxide (NO_{2}), ozone (O_{3}), and other peroxy compounds in the atmosphere. These oxidants participate in further atmospheric reactions which are said to "produce haze, damage plant and animal life, and materials such as rubber, induce discomfort and are suspected to have toxic effects on humans."

Mechanistic description for the formation of Photochemical Smog

$\ce{{\mathit NO2} + \mathit hv -> {\mathit NO} + \mathit O}$ (1)

Nitrogen dioxide reacts with UV radiation to form nitrogen oxide and an oxygen radical.

$\ce{{\mathit O} + \mathit O_2 -> {\mathit O_3}}$ (2)

The radical oxygen combines with O2 gas in the atmosphere to form ozone.

$\ce{{\mathit O_3} + \mathit NO -> {\mathit NO_2} + \mathit O_2}$ (3)

Ozone reacts with nitrogen oxide to form nitrogen dioxide and oxygen.

$\ce{\mathit R{H} + \mathit OH{.} -> \mathit R{.} + \mathit H_2O}$ (4)

A species of VOC bound to hydrogen reacts with hydroxide to form a VOC free-radical and water vapor.

$\ce{\mathit R{.} + \mathit O_2 -> \mathit RO_2}$ (5)

The free-radical VOC reacts with oxygen to form a VOC bound with oxygen gas.

$\ce{\mathit{R}{O2} + \mathit NO -> \mathit RO^-{.} +\mathit NO_2}$ (6)

The VOC oxygen bond is broken in the presence of nitrogen oxide, forming a VOC-oxygen anion and nitrogen dioxide to further participate in reaction 3. Where hv is UV radiation and R is a volatile organic compound (VOC). Additionally, some organic compounds (notably aldehydes) can photolyze in the atmosphere to form radicals which participate in atmospheric reactions. [46] VOCs or oxidant precursors are emitted to the atmosphere from both natural and man-made sources. Globally, natural emissions appear to outweigh anthropogenic emissions. However, it is the high concentration of anthropogenic sources of volatile organics together with NO_{x} emissions from combustion processes in urban areas which increase the risk of the urban ozone problem. Wind and other climatological activities (transport mechanisms) then carry the formed oxidant into rural areas.

===== VOC Diagnostics =====
Studies have been done to try to find if VOCs can be directly related to cancers in the human body. One such example is a group that collected breath samples from a lung cancer patient to determine the VOC content of the lungs before and after surgery. This study suggests that there may be certain biomarker VOCs that indicate the presence of a disease or cancer in a patient. Additional researchers have also begun trying to identify ties between the onset of cancer and the levels of VOCs in the environment. A database to gather information on cancer and other aspects of VOCs in human cell lines, the human volatilome, has been started by researchers.

==== Secondary Organic Aerosols (SOA) ====
Secondary Organic Aerosols (SOA) are a type of hazardous particulate that is not currently well understood, but is thought to make up a significant portion of the tropospheric aerosol or submicron atmospheric particle mass. [50,51] Aerosols effect the atmospheric radiative balance through the absorption and scattering of radiant energy, leading to shifts in weather via changes in cloud drop nucleation and the solar radiation budget. They are said to be formed "when the atmospheric oxidation products of volatile organic compounds undergo gas-particle transfer." The contribution of VOCs to the levels of SOA in the atmosphere have been modeled using simulation chamber experiments to gain a better understanding of the chemistry involved. SOAs are said to be a major causative factor to the mortality rates associated with the exposure to harmful fine particulate air pollution however there is an absence of in vitro particle exposure techniques to test for toxicity. There is research currently being done to find the interaction between SOA's and lung cells to see their potential harmful effects.

== Methods for Calculating and Estimating Flash Gas Composition and Flash Loss ==
=== Flash Gas Calculations ===
Calculation of flash gas content is often based on the principle of vapor-liquid equilibrium (VLE) and combines theories like Raoult's Law with component mass/energy balances, similar to those used in distillation unit operations. Since the mixture is of multiple components, more complex equations like the Rachford-Rice equation are applicable in ideal situations and have frequently been used in chemical plants and refineries. These equations are based on the ideal gas law and liquids at thermodynamic equilibrium, while hydrocarbons in oil and gas production are considered to be non-ideal or real, and may not be in equilibrium. Additional relationships, such as the Van Der Waals equation and other equations of state (EOS) can be applied to account for these discrepancies and can be used to provide a better estimation of flash gas content. Higher molecular weight hydrocarbons show even further deviation from ideal behavior and need additional computational adjustments, such as Sutton's modification to Steward et al.

=== Chemical Simulation ===
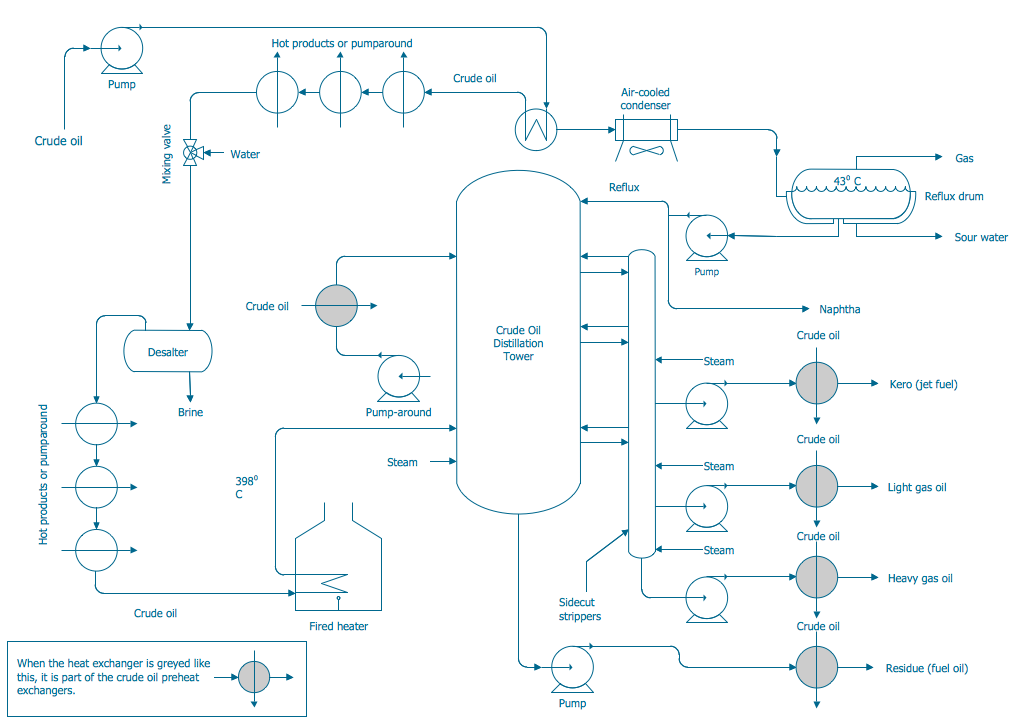
Example of a plot flow diagram (PFD) detailing a crude oil distillation operation.

More realistic modelling techniques encompass variable conditions that can occur on-site during petroleum processing by using sample analysis software at the flash site, e.g. ProMax Software, which is able to predict emissions and losses due to flash, i.e. working and standing losses. Other techniques that are used to make calculations of flash losses (without sampling and analysis) are referred to as chemical process simulators, e.g. WinSim, Designer II, HYSIM, and VMG. These programs can also have the ability to incorporate data from site-specific samples to give more accurate results. Alternatively, a captured liquid or gas sample can be analyzed in a laboratory setting to determine the composition and dissolved gas-oil-ratio (GOR) using precise measurement techniques. However, this only provides insight on the sample of flash gas and does not account for real time fluctuations of all on-site sources of flash gas, including working and standing losses.

=== Estimations Based on Volatile Organic Compounds ===
Another acceptable technique in flash estimation is the Vasques-Beggs Equation (VBE) which calculates the amount of flash gas in terms of total VOC and not into their individual components. This model can only calculate the instantaneous flash gas and does not calculate the working or standing flash gas losses. Additional equations have been developed to use in accordance with the VBE equation to determine species-specific losses, such as HAP-calc for determining the amount of Hazardous Air Pollution (HAP) produced.

=== Equations of State ===
An equation of state (EOS) is a thermodynamic equation relating state variables which describes the state of matter under a given set of physical conditions. EOS are used to make calculations about the predicted phase-behavior of hydrocarbons before extraction from a reservoir. Soave-Redlich-Kwong and Peng-Robinson are examples of two commonly used EOS in industry for determining critical properties of multicomponent mixtures. These equations can be useful for the prediction and estimation of flash loss when used in conjunction with sampling and reservoir data.

== Reduction of Flare Gas ==
=== Vapor Recovery Units ===
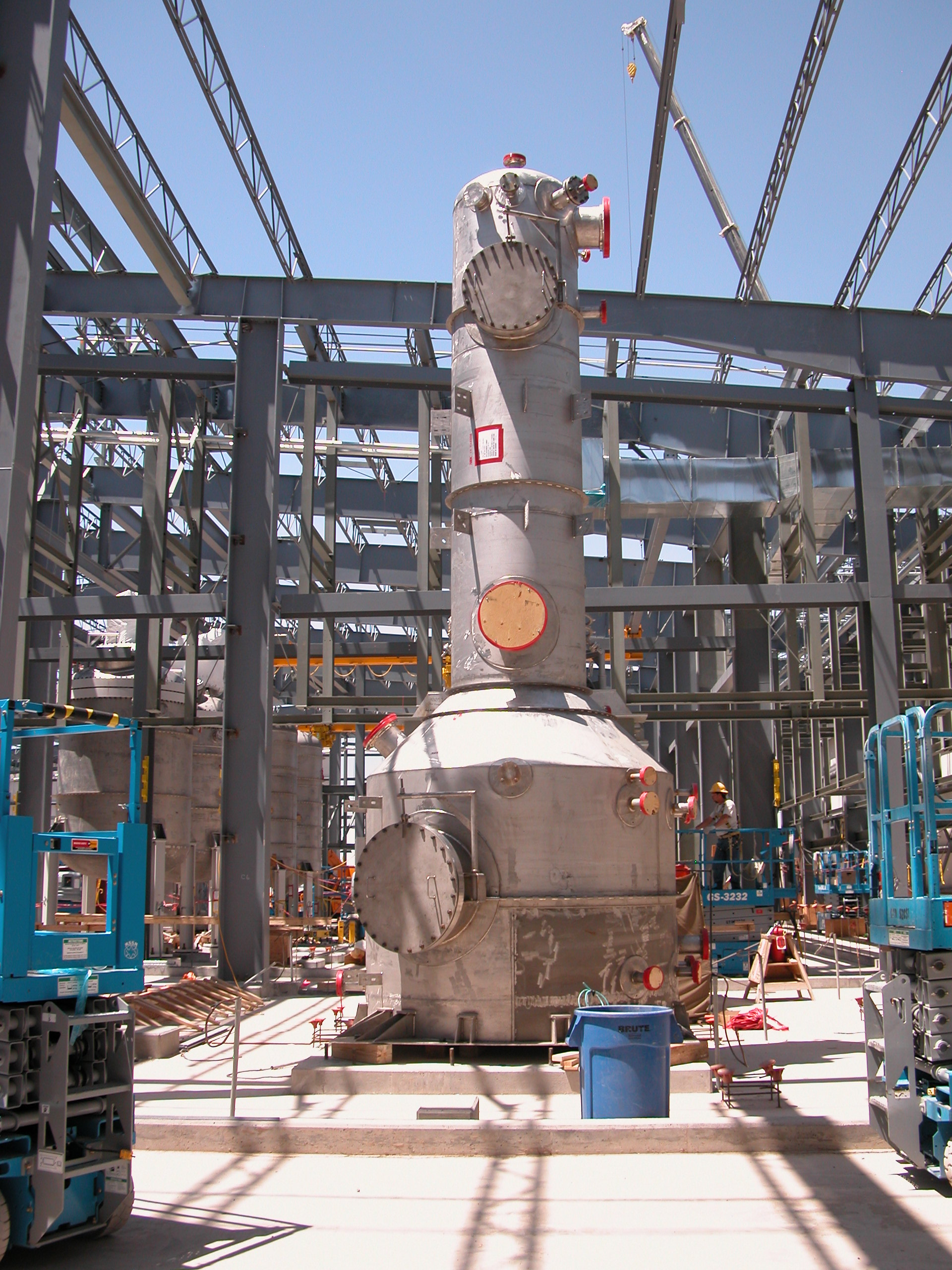
Pueblo Chemical Agent-Destruction Pilot Plant Scrubber Tower. The scrubber tower is part of the off-gas treatment system that will be used to filter air emissions from the Pueblo Chemical Agent-Destruction Pilot Plant.

Vapor Recovery Units (VRU's) have commonly been used to capture vented gas and other waste gas (vapor recovery) during petroleum production, it was originally created to capture hydrogen sulfide from oilfield stock tanks. A VRU works by compressing the flash gas that is produced in storage tanks and other units to be put into a pipeline. A basic VRU is made up of a scrubber, compressor, and a switch. Once the pressure in the tank reaches the set-point, the switch kicks on the compressor and sends the vapor to a scrubber where the liquid portion is separated out. The gas portions can be used to fuel on-site operation, be transported to storage tanks for further separation, can be piped out directly to another facility, or be injected into a compressor; the liquid portions (NGLs) that commonly form are normally sent to the water tank. If they are sent to oil storage they will re-vaporize and go through the VRU, creating an endless cycle.

VRU's can create revenue through the resale and use of the captured vapors that would have been vented into the environment and lost. The revenue produced is dependent on the amount of vapor captured and sold into a pipeline. Analysis has been done to show the economic impacts from emission reduction and capture using VRU and other technology. These units also reduce the amount of emissions of VOCs associated with oil and natural gas production, again by preventing them from being vented directly into the atmosphere.

There have been concerns raised about the efficiency of VRU's. It has been pointed out that vapor recovery units (VRU's) cannot recover lighter hydrocarbons that have been dissolved into the liquid phase because the units are designed to recover what is already in the vapor phase. Also, when the gas in put under high pipeline pressure, NGLs are condensed out and are returned to the water tank (in rare instances they are processed and sold as NGL's).

=== Thief Hatch Alternatives/Vapor Recovery Towers ===
Thief hatch, also known as a gauge hatch, is a term given to a close-able aperture on a tank or vessel used in the oil and gas industry. These hatches are placed in atmospheric or low pressure tanks in order to allow for level or sample measurements and to provide vacuum relief to the vessel. Thief hatches are also used in gauge tanks and in transport vehicles where they must be opened to the atmosphere to take measurements and samples. Flash gas is readily leaked whenever these hatches are opened and therefore they can pose a problem in terms of emissions. There have also been reports of fatalities caused by manual tank gauging and sampling via thief hatches.

Vapor recovery towers (VRT) have been posed as a potential solution for vapor loss via thief hatches. VRTs are a way to reduce the vapor loading on storage tanks by removing some of the flash gas before it gets to the oil tanks. The VRT can improve safety by reducing the potential for issues relating to high vapor evolution from the oil tanks.

=== Heater Treaters ===
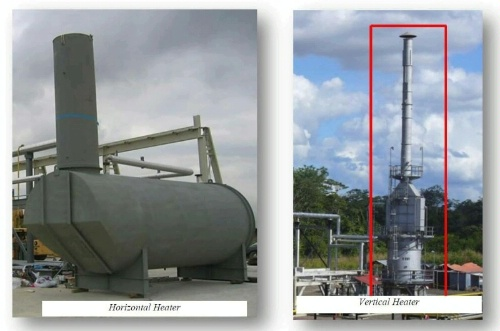
Vertical and horizontal heater treaters.

Heater treaters are often used in industry for the following: To break up emulsions to separate the oil from produced water, stabilize the crude oil or condensate by separating volatile, lighter hydrocarbon fractions, (C1-C8) from the heavy, less volatile fraction (C9+) for safety reasons. Vent gas from heater treaters is known as a significant source of flash gas and consequential VOCs. It is possible to re-route this vent gas to a VRU to capture some of the stream or other processing units in order to reduce emissions and make additional revenue.

=== Oil and Gas Separators/Pressure Optimization ===
Three phase separators are used in oil and gas production to separate water, oil, and gas into isolated streams. A separator, in general, is a pressurized vessel that is used to divide a product based on principles of chemical separation such as phase and density. These vessels are also known as de-liquidizers or degassers because they either remove liquid from the bulk gas stream or remove gas from the bulk liquid stream during processing. Pressure optimization based on sample compositions taken upstream can provide a solution to inefficient separations and can help to reduce the overall amount of flash gas produced.

== See also ==
- Flash-gas (refrigeration)
- Vapor recovery
