= Humid climate =

Humid climate is a climate with an excess of moisture. In the Köppen climate classification system, it is marked with middle letter f, standing for the German word for humid, feucht, unofficially translated to English as fully humid, though humid subtropical climates bordering tropical monsoon or tropical wet and dry climates have a dry season.

It may refer to:

- Humid continental climate (Köppen Dfa/b), a climatic type typified by four distinct seasons and large seasonal temperature differences
- Humid subtropical climate (Köppen Cfa), a zone of climate characterized by hot and humid summers, and cool to mild winters
- Equatorial or tropical rainforest climate. (Köppen Af). A tropical climate with no dry season.
- Humid temperate climate (not used in the Köppen climate classification, but may fall under the Cf classification), a temperate climate sub-type characterized by humidity and rain throughout the year from oceanic influence
