= Vapor-compression refrigeration =

Refrigeration process

A representative pressure–volume diagram for a refrigeration cycle

Vapour-compression refrigeration or vapor-compression refrigeration system (VCRS), in which the refrigerant undergoes phase changes, is one of the many refrigeration cycles and is the most widely used method for air conditioning of buildings and automobiles. It is also used in domestic and commercial refrigerators, large-scale warehouses for chilled or frozen storage of foods and meats, refrigerated trucks and railroad cars, and a host of other commercial and industrial services. Oil refineries, petrochemical and chemical processing plants are among the many types of industrial plants that often utilize large vapor-compression refrigeration systems. Cascade refrigeration systems may also be implemented using two pressure levels, where the heat flow from cold to warm is split over two separate refrigeration systems.

Refrigeration may be defined as lowering the temperature of an enclosed space by removing heat from that space and transferring it to a higher temperature level. A device that performs this function may also be called an air conditioner, refrigerator, air source heat pump, geothermal heat pump, or chiller (heat pump).

== Description ==
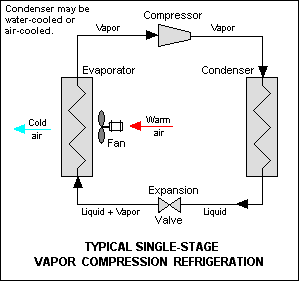
Figure 1: Vapor-compression refrigeration

Vapor-compression uses a circulating refrigerant fluid as the medium which absorbs and removes heat from the space to be cooled and subsequently rejects that heat elsewhere. Figure 1 depicts a typical, single-stage vapor-compression system. All such systems have four components: a compressor, a condenser, a thermal expansion valve (also called a throttle valve), and an evaporator.

Circulating refrigerant enters the compressor in the thermodynamic state known as a saturated vapor and is compressed to a higher pressure, resulting in a higher temperature as well. The hot, compressed vapor is then in the thermodynamic state known as a superheated vapor.

The superheated vapor then passes through the condenser. This is where heat is transferred from the circulating refrigerant to an external medium, allowing the gaseous refrigerant to cool and condense into a liquid. The rejected heat is carried away by either water or the air, depending on the type of condenser. In the case of a separated cascade system, the superheated vapor enters a heat exchanger where it instead transfers heat to a different refrigerant.

The condensed liquid refrigerant, in the thermodynamic state known as a saturated liquid, is next routed through an expansion valve where it undergoes an abrupt reduction in pressure. That pressure reduction results in the adiabatic flash evaporation of a part of the liquid refrigerant. The auto-refrigeration effect of the adiabatic flash evaporation lowers the temperature of the liquid and vapor refrigerant mixture to where it is colder than the temperature of the enclosed space to be refrigerated.

The cold refrigerant liquid and vapor mixture is then routed through the evaporator. Air or any other fluid to be refrigerated in the enclosed space circulates across the evaporator due to either thermal convection or a fan. Since the fluid is warmer than the cold liquid refrigerant, heat is transferred from the fluid to the refrigerant, which cools the fluid and warms the refrigerant, causing evaporation, returning it to a gaseous state. While liquid remains in the refrigerant flow, its temperature will not rise above the boiling point of the refrigerant. Most systems are designed to evaporate all of the refrigerant to ensure that no liquid is returned to the compressor.

To complete the refrigeration cycle, the refrigerant vapor from the evaporator is again a saturated vapor and is routed back into the compressor. Over time, the evaporator may collect ice or water from ambient humidity. The ice is melted through defrosting. The water from the melted ice or the evaporator then drips into a drip pan, and the water is carried away by gravity or a condensate pump.

=== Refrigerants ===
The selection of working fluid has a significant impact on the performance of the refrigeration cycles and as such it plays a key role when it comes to designing or simply choosing an ideal machine for a certain task. One of the most widespread refrigerants is "Freon". Freon is a trade name for a family of haloalkane refrigerants manufactured by DuPont and other companies. These refrigerants were commonly used due to their superior stability and safety properties: they were not flammable at room temperature and atmospheric pressure, nor obviously toxic as were the fluids they replaced, such as sulfur dioxide. Haloalkanes are also an order(s) of magnitude more expensive than petroleum-derived flammable alkanes of similar or better cooling performance.

Unfortunately, chlorine- and fluorine-bearing refrigerants reach the upper atmosphere when they escape. In the stratosphere, substances like CFCs and HCFCs break up due to UV radiation, releasing their chlorine free-radicals. These chlorine free-radicals act as catalysts in the breakdown of ozone through chain reactions. One CFC molecule can cause thousands of ozone molecules to break down. This causes severe damage to the ozone layer that shields the Earth's surface from the Sun's strong UV radiation and has been shown to lead to increased rates of skin cancer. The chlorine will remain active as a catalyst until and unless it binds with another particle, forming a stable molecule. CFC refrigerants in common but receding usage include R-11 and R-12.

Newer refrigerants that have reduced ozone depletion effects compared to CFCs have replaced most CFC use. Examples include HCFCs (such as R-22, used in most homes) and HFCs (such as R-134a, used in most cars). HCFCs in turn are being phased out under the Montreal Protocol and replaced by hydrofluorocarbons (HFCs), which do not contain chlorine atoms. However, CFCs, HCFCs, and HFCs all have very large global warming potential (GWP).

More benign refrigerants are currently the subject of research, such as supercritical carbon dioxide, known as R-744. These have similar efficiencies compared to existing CFC- and HFC-based compounds, and have many orders of magnitude lower global warming potential. General industry and governing body push are toward more GWP-friendly refrigerants. In industrial settings ammonia, as well as gasses like ethylene, propane, iso-butane and other hydrocarbons are commonly used (and have their own R-x customary numbers), depending on required temperatures and pressures. Many of these gases are flammable, explosive, or toxic; making their use restricted (i.e. well-controlled environment by qualified personnel, or a very small amount of refrigerant used). HFOs which can be considered to be HFCs with some carbon-carbon bonds being double bounds, do show promise of lowering GWP so little to be of no further concern. In the meantime, various blends of existing refrigerants are used to achieve the required properties and efficiency, at a reasonable cost and lower GWP.

== Thermodynamic analysis of the system ==
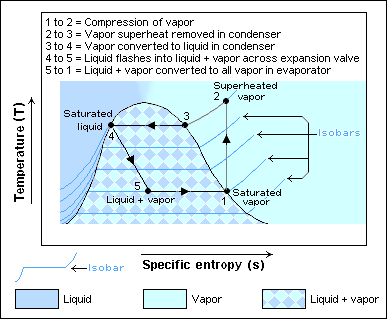
Figure 2: Temperature–Entropy diagram

The thermodynamics of the vapor-compression cycle can be analyzed on a temperature versus entropy diagram as depicted in Figure 2. At point 1 in the diagram, the circulating refrigerant enters the compressor as a low-temperature, low-pressure saturated vapor. From point 1 to point 2, the vapor is isentropically compressed (compressed at constant entropy) and exits the compressor as a high-pressure, high-temperature vapor.

From point 2 to point 3, the vapor travels through part of the condenser which removes the heat by cooling the vapor. Between point 3 and point 4, the vapor travels through the remainder of the condenser and is condensed into a high-temperature, high-pressure subcooled liquid. Subcool is the amount of sensible heat removed from the liquid below its maximum saturation. The condensation process occurs at essentially constant pressure.

Between points 4 and 5, the subcooled liquid refrigerant passes through the expansion valve and undergoes an abrupt decrease of pressure. That process results in the adiabatic flash evaporation and auto-refrigeration of a portion of the liquid (typically, less than half of the liquid flashes). The adiabatic flash evaporation process is isenthalpic (occurs at constant enthalpy).

Between points 5 and 1, the cold and partially vaporized refrigerant travels through the coil or tubes in the evaporator where it is totally vaporized by the warm air (from the space being refrigerated) that a fan circulates across the coil or tubes in the evaporator. The evaporation process occurs at essentially constant temperature. After evaporation is completed, the vapor will start to increase in temperature. The amount of sensible heat added to the vapor above its saturation point, i.e. its boiling point, is called superheat.

The resulting superheated vapor returns to the compressor inlet at point 1 to complete the thermodynamic cycle.

The above discussion is based on the ideal vapor-compression refrigeration cycle which does not take into account real world items like frictional pressure drop in the system, slight internal irreversibility during the compression of the refrigerant vapor, or non-ideal gas behavior (if any).

== Types of gas compressors ==
The most common compressors used in refrigeration are reciprocating and scroll compressors, but large chillers or industrial cycles may use rotary screw or centrifugal compressors. Each application prefers one or another due to size, noise, efficiency, and pressure issues. Compressors are often described as being either open, hermetic, or semi-hermetic, to describe how the compressor and/or motor is situated in relation to the refrigerant being compressed. Variations of motor/compressor types can lead to the following configurations:

- Hermetic motor, hermetic compressor
- Hermetic motor, semi-hermetic compressor
- Open motor (belt driven or close coupled), hermetic compressor
- Open motor (belt driven or close coupled), semi-hermetic compressor

Typically in hermetic, and most semi-hermetic compressors (sometimes known as accessible hermetic compressors), the compressor and motor driving the compressor are integrated, and operate within the refrigerant system. The motor is hermetic and is designed to operate, and be cooled by, the refrigerant being compressed. The obvious disadvantage of hermetic motor compressors is that the motor drive cannot be maintained in situ, and the entire compressor must be removed if a motor fails. A further disadvantage is that burnt out windings can contaminate whole refrigeration systems requiring the system to be entirely pumped down, and the refrigerant replaced.

An open compressor has a motor drive which is outside of the refrigeration system, and provides drive to the compressor by means of an input shaft with suitable gland seals. Open compressor motors are typically air-cooled and can be fairly easily exchanged or repaired without degassing of the refrigeration system. The disadvantage of this type of compressor is a failure of the shaft seals, leading to loss of refrigerant.

Open motor compressors are generally easier to cool (using ambient air) and therefore tend to be simpler in design and more reliable, especially in high pressure applications where compressed gas temperatures can be very high. However the use of liquid injection for additional cooling can generally overcome this issue in most hermetic motor compressors.

=== Reciprocating compressors ===
Reciprocating compressor

Reciprocating compressors are piston-style, positive displacement compressors.

=== Rotary screw compressors ===
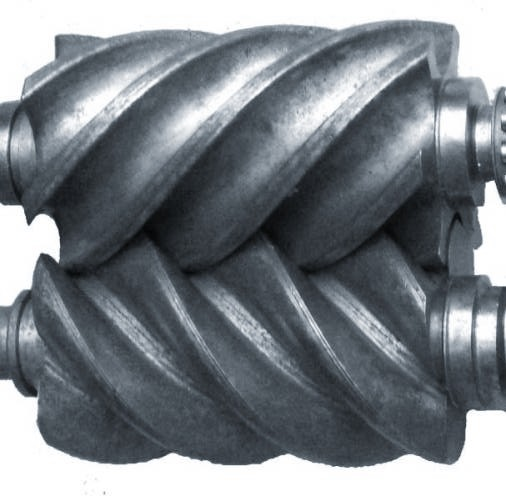
Lysholm screw compressor

Rotary screw compressors are also positive displacement compressors. Two meshing screw-rotors rotate in opposite directions, trapping refrigerant vapor, and reducing the volume of the refrigerant along the rotors to the discharge point.

Small units are not practical due to back-leakage but large units have very high efficiency and flow capacity.

=== Centrifugal compressors ===
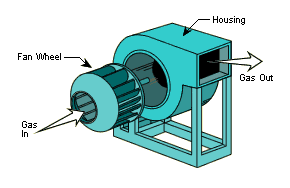
Centrifugal principle

Centrifugal compressors are dynamic compressors. These compressors raise the pressure of the refrigerant by imparting velocity or dynamic energy, using a rotating impeller, and converting it to pressure energy.

==== Centrifugal Compressor Surge ====
Chillers with centrifugal compressors have a 'Centrifugal Compressor Map' that shows the "surge line" and the "choke line." For the same capacity ratings, across a wider span of operating conditions, chillers with the larger diameter lower-speed compressor have a wider 'Centrifugal Compressor Map' and experience surge conditions less than those with the smaller diameter, less expensive, higher-speed compressors. The smaller diameter, higher-speed compressors have a flatter curve.,

As the refrigerant flow rate decreases, some compressors change the gap between the impeller and the volute to maintain the correct velocity to avoid surge conditions.

=== Scroll compressors ===
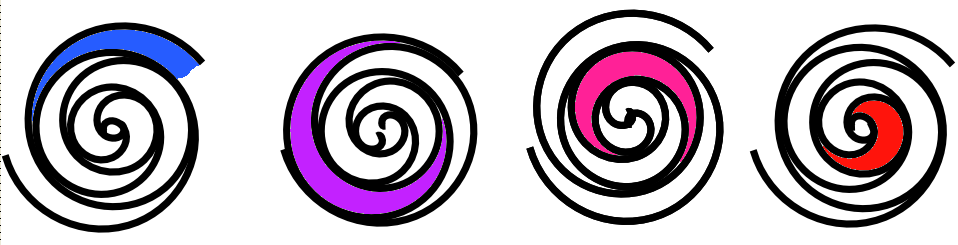
Figure 4: Operating principle of a Scroll Compressor

Scroll compressors are also positive displacement compressors. The refrigerant is compressed when one spiral orbits around a second stationary spiral, creating smaller and smaller pockets and higher pressures. By the time the refrigerant is discharged, it is fully pressurized.

=== Others ===
Diaphragm pump

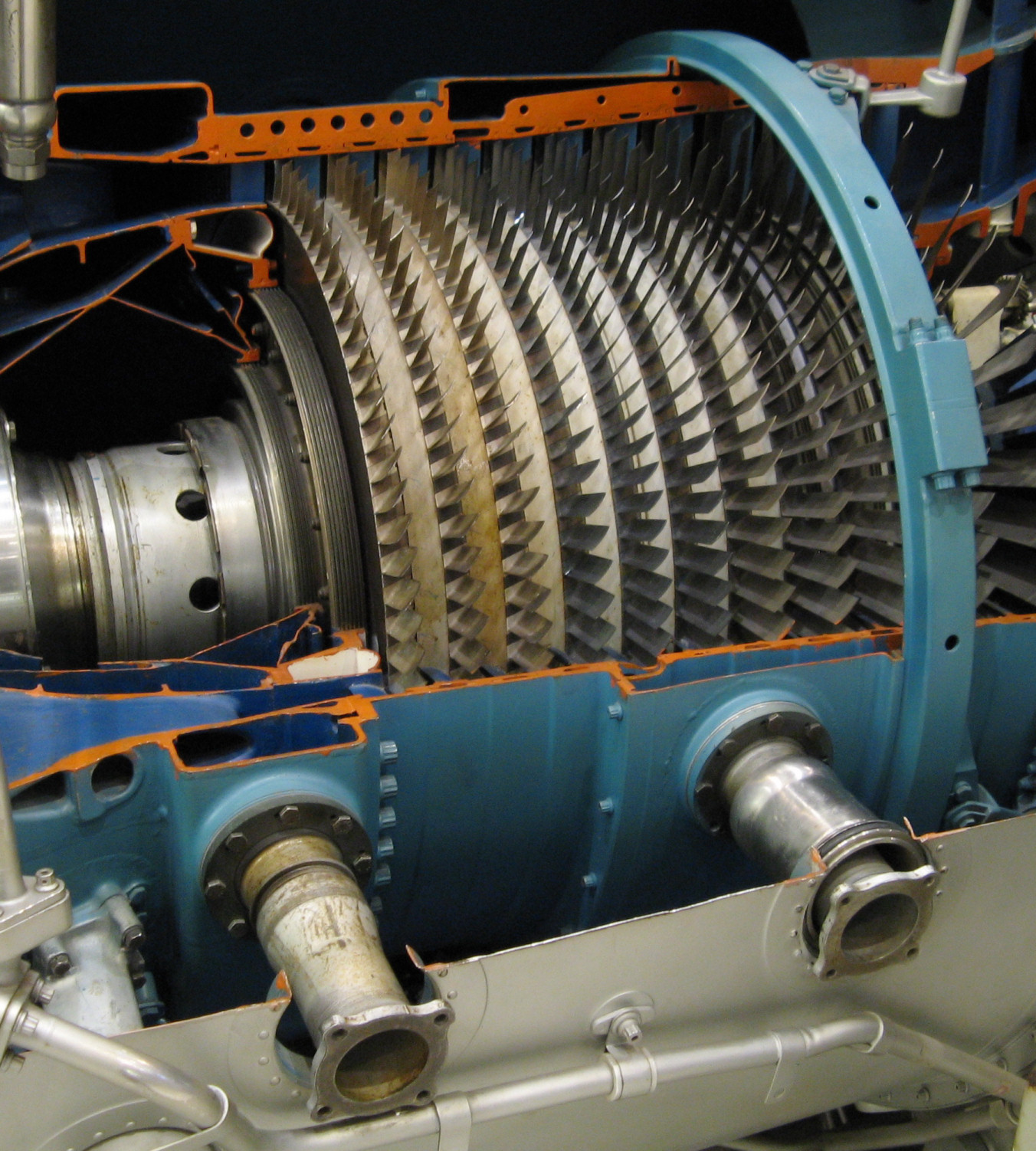
Axial-flow compressor of a jet engine

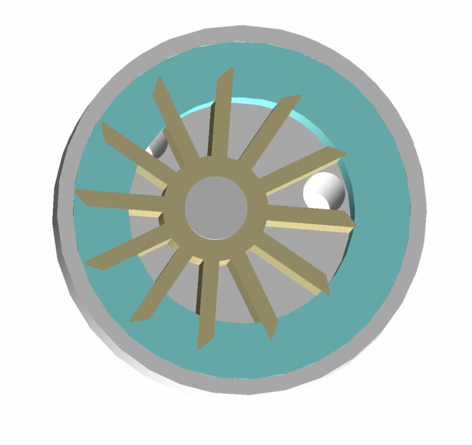
Liquid ring

Roots blower

== Compressor lubrication ==
In order to lubricate the moving parts of the compressor, oil is added to the refrigerant during installation or commissioning. The type of oil may be mineral or synthetic to suit the compressor type, and also chosen so as not to react with the refrigerant type and other components in the system. In small refrigeration systems the oil is allowed to circulate throughout the whole circuit, but care must be taken to design the pipework and components such that oil can drain back under gravity to the compressor. In larger more distributed systems, especially in retail refrigeration, the oil is normally captured at an oil separator immediately after the compressor, and is in turn re-delivered, by an oil level management system, back to the compressor(s). Oil separators are not 100% efficient so system pipework must still be designed so that oil can drain back by gravity to the oil separator or compressor.

Some newer compressor technologies use magnetic bearings or air bearings and require no lubrication, for example the Danfoss Turbocor range of centrifugal compressors. Avoiding the need for oil lubrication and the design requirements and ancillaries associated with it, simplifies the design of the refrigerant system, increases the heat transfer coefficient in evaporators and condensers, eliminates the risk of refrigerant being contaminated with oil, and reduces maintenance requirements.

== Control ==
In simple commercial refrigeration systems the compressor is normally controlled by a simple pressure switch, with the expansion performed by a capillary tube or thermal expansion valve. In more complex systems, including multiple compressor installations, the use of electronic controls is typical, with adjustable set points to control the pressure at which compressors cut in and cut out, and temperature control by the use of electronic expansion valves.

In addition to the operational controls, separate high-pressure and low-pressure switches are normally utilised to provide secondary protection to the compressors and other components of the system from operating outside of safe parameters.

In more advanced electronic control systems the use of floating head pressure, and proactive suction pressure, control routines allow the compressor operation to be adjusted to accurately meet differing cooling demands while reducing energy consumption.

== Other features and facts of interest ==
The schematic diagram of a single-stage refrigeration system shown in Figure 1 does not include other equipment items that would be provided in a large commercial or industrial vapor-compression refrigeration system, such as:

- A horizontal or vertical pressure vessel, equipped internally with a demister, between the evaporator and the compressor inlet to capture and remove any residual, entrained liquid in the refrigerant vapor because liquid may damage the compressor. Such vapor–liquid separators are most often referred to as "suction line accumulators". (In other industrial processes, they are called "compressor suction drums" or "knockout pots".)
- Large commercial or industrial refrigeration systems may have multiple expansion valves and multiple evaporators in order to refrigerate multiple enclosed spaces or rooms. In such systems, the condensed liquid refrigerant may be routed into a pressure vessel, called a receiver, from which liquid refrigerant is withdrawn and routed through multiple pipelines to the multiple expansion valves and evaporators.
- Filter Dryers, installed before the compressors to catch any moisture or contaminants in the system and thus protect the compressors from internal damage
- Some refrigeration units may have multiple stages which requires the use of multiple compressors in various arrangements.

In most of the world, the cooling capacity of refrigeration systems is measured in watts. Common residential air conditioning units range in capacity from 3.5 to 18 kilowatt. In a few countries it is measured in "tons of refrigeration", with common residential air conditioning units from about 1 to 5 tons of refrigeration.

== Applications ==
Refrigeration application	Short descriptions	Typical refrigerants used
Domestic refrigeration	Appliances used for keeping food in dwelling units	R-600a, R-134a, R-22,
Commercial refrigeration	Holding and displaying frozen and fresh food in retail outlets	R-290, R-134a, R-404A, R-507
Food processing and cold storage	Equipment to preserve, process, and store food from its source to the wholesale distribution point	R-123, R-134a, R-407C, R-410A, R-507
Industrial refrigeration	Large equipment, typically 25 kW to 30 MW, used for chemical processing, cold storage, food processing, building, and district heating and cooling	R-123, R-134a, R-404A, R-407C, R-507, R-717
Transport refrigeration	Equipment to preserve and store goods, primarily foodstuffs, during transport by road, rail, air, and sea	R-134a, R-407C, R-410A
Electronic cooling	Low-temperature cooling of CMOS circuitry and other components in large computers and servers	R-134a, R-404A, R-507
Medical refrigeration		R-290, R-134a, R-404A, R-507
Cryogenic refrigeration		Ethylene, propane, nitrogen, helium

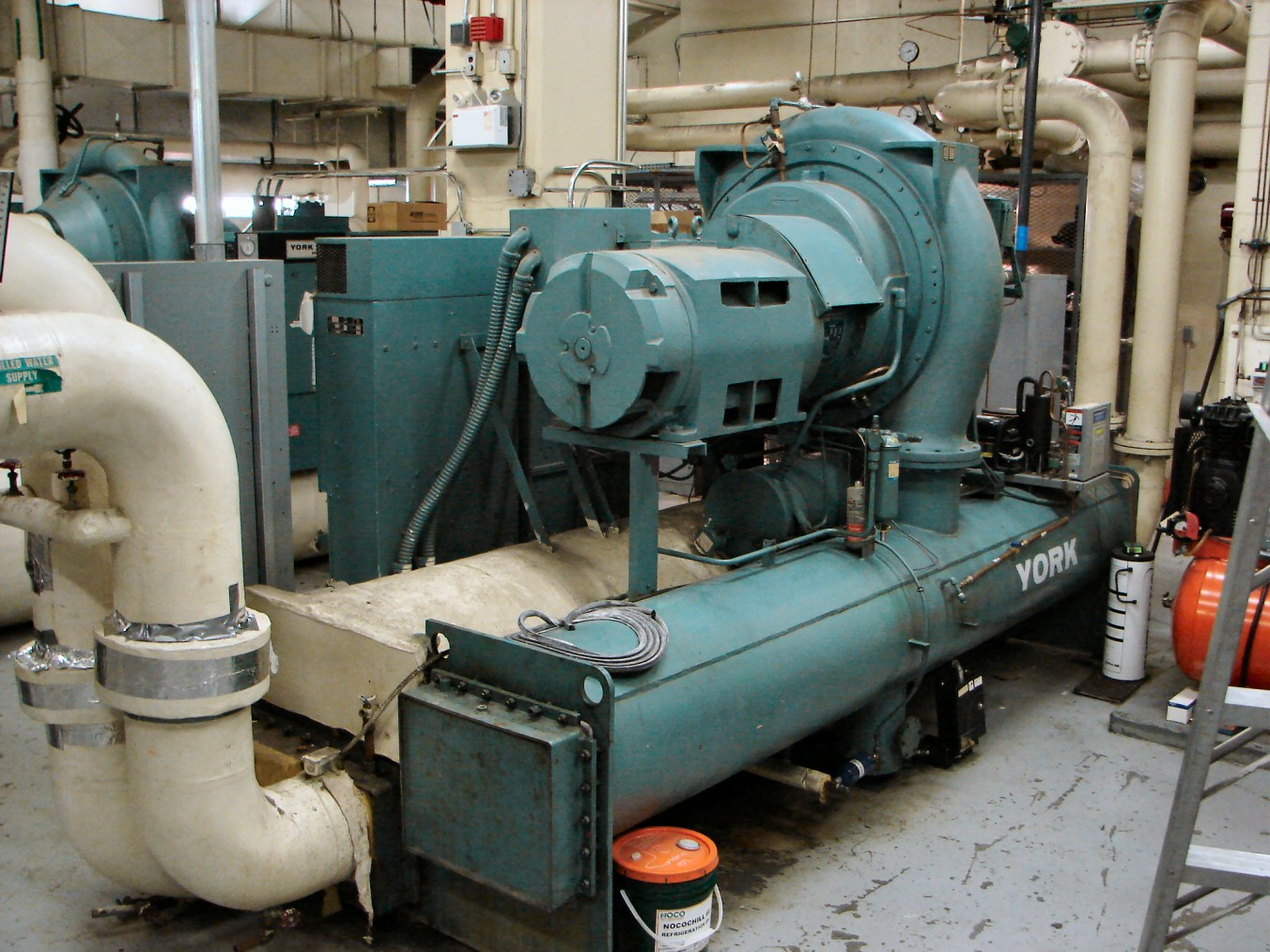
Figure 5: Commercial water-cooled liquid chiller installation for building air conditioning

== Economic analysis ==
=== Advantages ===
- Very mature technology.
- Relatively inexpensive.
- Can be driven directly using mechanical energy (water, car or truck motor) or with electrical energy.
- COP typically reaches anywhere from 2–5, but can get higher or lower depending on compressor efficiency and refrigerant enthalpy of vaporization, as the compressor only manipulates the boiling point of the fluid and moves it, rather than directly moving the heat solely by compressing the gas isothermally (as in Carnot cycle pumps, which can only ever reach a COP of 1). instead, the enthalpy of the fluid does the work in moving the heat, mostly by boiling or condensing the fluid, but partially by changing the temperature of the fluid.
- COP is the ratio of heat in or heat out over compressor input energy, and using carnot efficiency to refer to the efficiency of a vapour-compression heat pump using a specific refrigerant is confusing and misleading, and rarely has practical application.

=== Disadvantages ===
Many systems still use HCFC refrigerants, which contribute to depletion of the Earth's ozone layer. In countries adhering to the Montreal Protocol, HCFCs are due to be phased out and are largely being replaced by ozone-friendly HFCs. However, systems using HFC refrigerants tend to be slightly less efficient than systems using HCFCs. HFCs also have an extremely large global warming potential, because they remain in the atmosphere for many years and trap heat more effectively than carbon dioxide.

With the ultimate phasing out of HCFCs already a certainty, alternative non-haloalkane refrigerants are gaining popularity. In particular, once-abandoned refrigerants such as hydrocarbons (butane for example) and CO_{2} are coming back into more extensive use. For example, Coca-Cola's vending machines at the 2006 FIFA World Cup in Germany used refrigeration utilizing CO_{2}. Ammonia (NH_{3}) is one of the oldest refrigerants, with excellent performance and essentially no pollution problems. However, ammonia has two disadvantages: it is toxic and it is incompatible with copper tubing.

== History ==
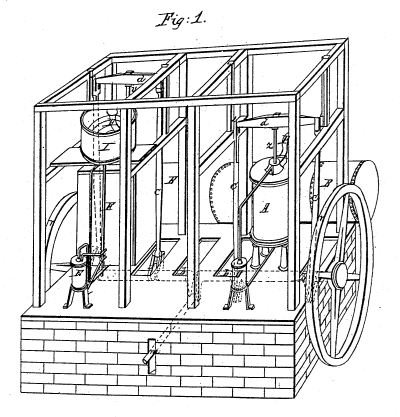
Schematic of Dr. John Gorrie's 1841 mechanical ice machine

In 1805, the American inventor Oliver Evans described a closed vapor-compression refrigeration cycle for the production of ice by ether under vacuum. Heat would be removed from the environment by recycling vaporized refrigerant, where it would move through a compressor and condenser, and would eventually revert to a liquid form in order to repeat the refrigeration process over again. However, no such refrigeration unit was built by Evans.

In 1834, an American expatriate to Great Britain, Jacob Perkins, built the first working vapor-compression refrigeration system in the world. It was a closed-cycle that could operate continuously, as he described in his patent:

I am enabled to use volatile fluids for the purpose of producing the cooling or freezing of fluids, and yet at the same time constantly condensing such volatile fluids, and bringing them again into operation without waste.

His prototype system worked although it did not succeed commercially.

A similar attempt was made in 1842, by American physician, John Gorrie, who built a working prototype, but it was a commercial failure. American engineer Alexander Twining took out a British patent in 1850 for a vapor-compression system that used ether.

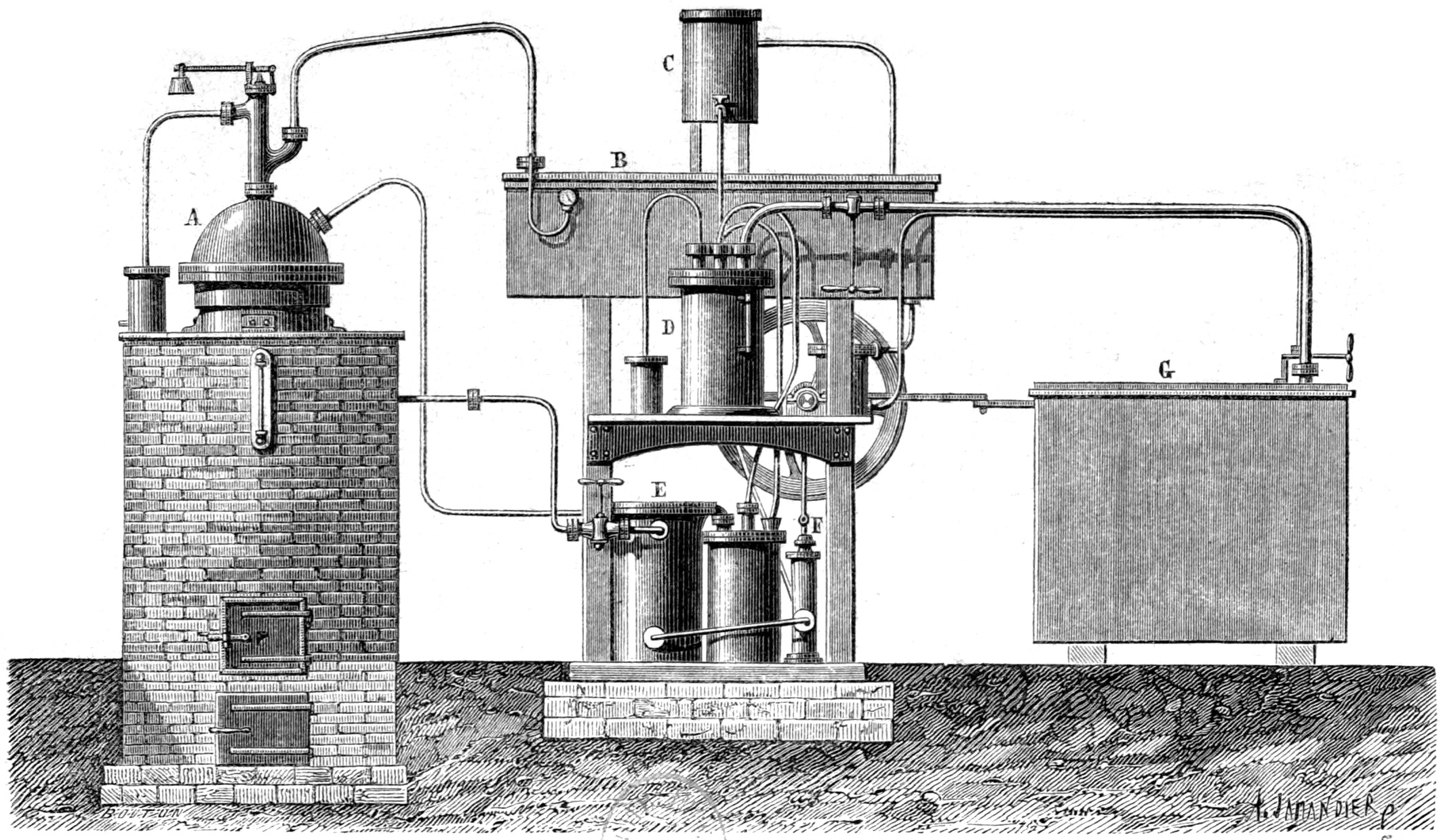
Ferdinand Carré's ice-making device

The first practical vapor-compression refrigeration system was built by James Harrison, a British journalist who had emigrated to Australia. His 1856 patent was for a vapor-compression system using ether, alcohol or ammonia. He built a mechanical ice-making machine in 1851 on the banks of the Barwon River at Rocky Point in Geelong, Victoria, and his first commercial ice-making machine followed in 1854. Harrison also introduced commercial vapor-compression refrigeration to breweries and meat packing houses and, by 1861, a dozen of his systems were in operation in Australia and England.

The first gas absorption refrigeration system using gaseous ammonia dissolved in water (referred to as "aqua ammonia") was developed by Ferdinand Carré of France in 1859 and patented in 1860. Carl von Linde, an engineering professor at the Technical University of Munich in Germany, patented an improved method of liquefying gases in 1876. His new process made possible using gases such as ammonia, sulfur dioxide SO_{2}, and methyl chloride (CH_{3}Cl) as refrigerants and they were widely used for that purpose until the late 1920s.

== See also ==
- Absorption refrigerator
  - Einstein refrigerator
- Air conditioning
- Flash evaporation
- Heat pump
- Heating, ventilation, and air conditioning (HVAC)
- Magnetic refrigeration
- Refrigerant
- Refrigeration
- Heat pump and refrigeration cycle
- Working fluid
