= Thermal expansion valve =

Component of air conditioning and refrigeration systems

Basic construction of a TEV. The flexible diaphragm actuates the poppet valve; an increasing pressure in the sensing bulb will press down on the poppet and open the valve further. There is also an adjustable spring providing a closing force on the valve which controls the superheat.

The sensing bulb is positioned near the end of the evaporator and ensures enough refrigerant flows to chill the whole evaporator, but not so much that liquid reaches the sensing position. The equalisation connection is needed when the pressure at the sensing position differs from the pressure at the valve output.

A thermal expansion valve, or thermostatic expansion valve (often abbreviated as TEV, TXV, or TX valve), is a component in vapor-compression refrigeration and air conditioning systems that controls the amount of refrigerant released into the evaporator and is intended to regulate the superheat of the refrigerant that flows out of the evaporator to a steady value. Although often described as a "thermostatic" valve, an expansion valve is not able to regulate the evaporator's temperature to a precise value. The evaporator's temperature will vary only with the evaporating pressure, which will have to be regulated through other means (such as by adjusting the compressor's capacity).

Thermal expansion valves are often referred to generically as "metering devices", although this may also refer to any other device that releases liquid refrigerant into the low-pressure section but does not react to temperature, such as a capillary tube or a pressure-controlled valve.

== Theory of operation ==
A thermal expansion valve is a key element to a heat pump; this is the cycle that makes air conditioning, or air cooling, possible. A basic refrigeration cycle consists of four major elements: a compressor, a condenser, a metering device and an evaporator. As a refrigerant passes through a circuit containing these four elements, air conditioning occurs.

The cycle starts when refrigerant enters the compressor in a low-pressure, moderate-temperature, gaseous form. The refrigerant is compressed by the compressor to a high-pressure and high-temperature gaseous state. The high-pressure and high-temperature gas then enters the condenser. The condenser cools the high-pressure and high-temperature gas allowing it to condense to a high-pressure liquid by transferring heat to a lower temperature medium, usually ambient air. In order to produce a cooling effect from the higher pressure liquid, the flow of refrigerant entering the evaporator is restricted by the expansion valve, reducing the pressure and allowing isenthalpic expansion back into the vapor phase to take place, which absorbs heat and results in cooling.

A TXV type expansion device has a sensing bulb that is filled with a liquid whose thermodynamic properties are similar to those of the refrigerant. This bulb is thermally connected to the output of the evaporator so that the temperature of the refrigerant that leaves the evaporator can be sensed. The gas pressure in the sensing bulb provides the force to open the TXV, and as the temperature drops this force will decrease, therefore dynamically adjusting the flow of refrigerant into the evaporator.

The superheat is the excess temperature of the vapor above its boiling point at the evaporating pressure. No superheat indicates that the refrigerant is not being fully vaporized within the evaporator and liquid may end up recirculated to the compressor which is inefficient and can cause damage. Conversely, excessive superheat indicates that there is insufficient refrigerant flowing through the evaporator coil, and thus a significant portion toward the end is not providing cooling. Therefore, by regulating the superheat to a small value, typically only a few °C, the heat transfer of the evaporator will be near optimal, without excess liquid refrigerant being returned to the compressor.

In order to provide an appropriate superheat, a spring force is often applied in the direction that would close the valve, meaning that the valve will close when the bulb is at a lower temperature than the refrigerant is evaporating at. Spring-type valves may be fixed, or adjustable, although other methods to ensure a superheat also exist, such as the sensing bulb having a different vapor composition to the rest of the system.

Some thermal expansion valves are also specifically designed to ensure that a certain minimum flow of refrigerant can always flow through the system, while others can also be designed to control the evaporator's pressure so that it never rises above a maximum value.

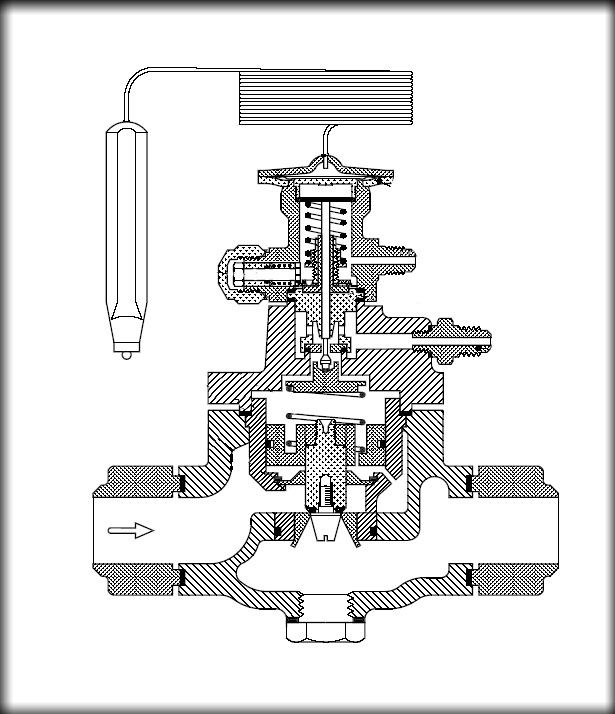
A pilot-operated thermostatic expansion valve. The upper valve is an externally balanced TEV; flow through this valve opens the larger lower valve.

== Description ==
Flow control, or metering, of the refrigerant is accomplished by use of a temperature sensing bulb, filled with a gas or liquid charge similar to the one inside the system, that causes the orifice in the valve to open against the spring pressure in the valve body as the temperature on the bulb increases. As the suction line temperature decreases, so does the pressure in the bulb and therefore on the spring, causing the valve to close. An air conditioning system with a TX valve is often more efficient than those with designs that do not use one. Also, TX valve air conditioning systems do not require an accumulator (a refrigerant tank placed downstream of the evaporator's outlet), since the valves reduce the liquid refrigerant flow when the evaporator's thermal load decreases, so that all the refrigerant completely evaporates inside the evaporator (in normal operating conditions such as a proper evaporator temperature and airflow). However, a liquid refrigerant receiver tank needs to be placed in the liquid line before the TX valve so that, in low evaporator thermal load conditions, any excess liquid refrigerant can be stored inside it, preventing any liquid from backflowing inside the condenser coil from the liquid line.

At heat loads which are very low compared to the valve's power rating, the orifice can become oversized for the heat load, and the valve can begin to repeatedly open and close, in an attempt to control the superheat to the set value, making the superheat oscillate. Cross charges, that is, sensing bulb charges composed of a mixture of different refrigerants or also non-refrigerant gases such as nitrogen (as opposed to a charge composed exclusively of the same refrigerant inside the system, known as a parallel charge), set so that the vapor pressure vs temperature curve of the bulb charge "crosses" the vapor pressure vs temperature curve of the system's refrigerant at a certain temperature value (that is, a bulb charge set so that, below a certain refrigerant temperature, the vapor pressure of the bulb charge suddenly becomes higher than that of the system's refrigerant, forcing the metering pin to stay into an open position), help to reduce the superheat hunt phenomenon by preventing the valve orifice from completely closing during system operation. The same result can be attained through different kinds of bleed passages that generate a minimum refrigerant flow at all times. The cost, however, is determining a certain flow of refrigerant that will not reach the suction line in a fully evaporated state while the heat load is particularly low, and that the compressor must be designed to handle. By carefully selecting the amount of a liquid sensing bulb charge, a so-called MOP (maximum operating pressure) effect can also be attained; above a precise refrigerant temperature, the sensing bulb charge will be entirely evaporated, making the valve begin restricting flow irrespective of the sensed superheat, rather than increasing it in order to bring evaporator superheat down to the target value. Therefore, the evaporator pressure will be kept from increasing above the MOP value. This feature helps to control the compressor's maximum operating torque to a value that is acceptable for the application, such as a small displacement car engine.

A low refrigerant charge condition is often accompanied when the compressor is operational by a loud whooshing sound heard from the thermal expansion valve and the evaporator, which is caused by the lack of a liquid head right before the valve's moving orifice, resulting in the orifice trying to meter a vapor or a vapor/liquid mixture instead of a liquid.

== Types ==
There are two main types of thermal expansion valves: internally or externally equalized. The difference between externally and internally equalized valves is how the evaporator pressure affects the position of the needle. In internally equalized valves, the evaporator pressure against the diaphragm is the pressure at the inlet of the evaporator (typically via an internal connection to the outlet of the valve), whereas in externally equalized valves, the evaporator pressure against the diaphragm is the pressure at the outlet of the evaporator. Externally equalized thermostatic expansion valves compensate for any pressure drop through the evaporator. For internally equalised valves a pressure drop in the evaporator will have the effect of increasing the superheat.

Internally equalized valves can be used on single circuit evaporator coils having low-pressure drop. If a refrigerant distributor is used for multiple parallel evaporators (rather than a valve on each evaporator) then an externally equalized valve must be used. Externally equalized TXVs can be used on all applications; however, an externally equalized TXV cannot be replaced with an internally equalized TXV. For automotive applications, a type of externally equalized thermal expansion valve, known as the block type valve, is often used. In this type, either a sensing bulb is located within the suction line connection within the valve body and is in constant contact with the refrigerant that flows out of the evaporator's outlet, or a heat transfer means is provided so that the refrigerant is able to exchange heat with the sensing charge contained in a chamber located above the diaphragm as it flows to the suction line.

Although the bulb/diaphragm type is used in most systems that control the refrigerant superheat, electronic expansion valves are becoming more common in larger systems or systems with multiple evaporators to allow them to be adjusted independently. Although electronic valves can provide greater control range and flexibility that bulb/diaphragm types cannot provide, they add complexity and points of failure to a system as they require additional temperature and pressure sensors and an electronic control circuit. Most electronic valves use a stepper motor hermetically sealed inside the valve to actuate a needle valve with a screw mechanism, on some units only the stepper rotor is within the hermetic body and is magnetically driven through the sealed valve body by stator coils on the outside of the device.
