= Condenser (heat transfer) =

System for condensing gas into liquid by cooling

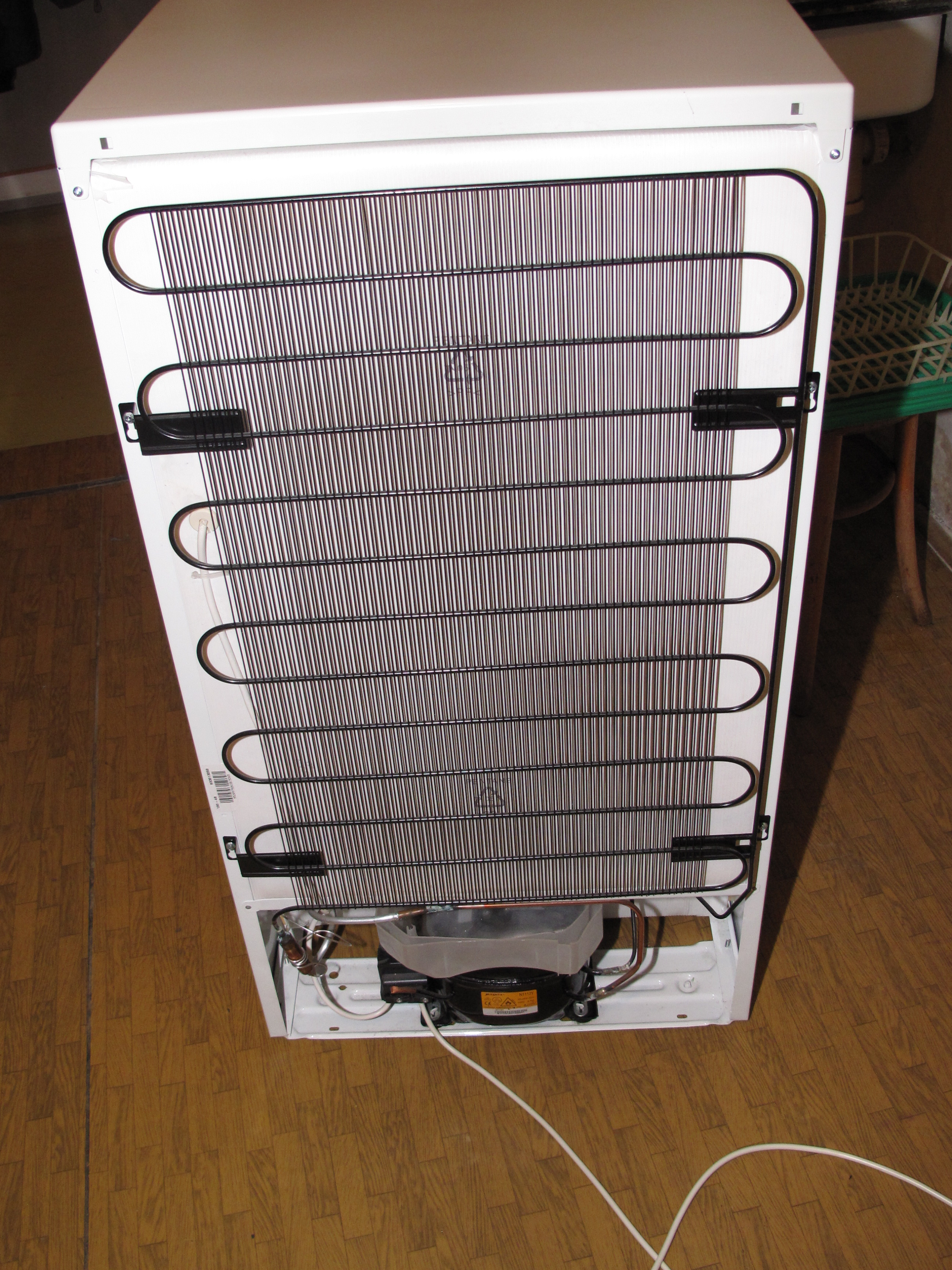
The condenser coil of a refrigerator

In systems involving heat transfer, a condenser is a heat exchanger used to condense a gaseous substance into a liquid state through cooling. In doing so, the latent heat is released by the substance and transferred to the surrounding environment. Condensers are used for efficient heat rejection in many industrial systems. Condensers can be made according to numerous designs and come in many sizes ranging from rather small (hand-held) to very large (industrial-scale units used in plant processes). For example, a refrigerator uses a condenser to get rid of heat extracted from the interior of the unit to the outside air.

Condensers are used in air conditioning, industrial chemical processes such as distillation, steam power plants, and other heat-exchange systems. The use of cooling water or surrounding air as the coolant is common in many condensers.

== History ==
The earliest laboratory condenser, a "Gegenstromkühler" (counter-flow condenser), was invented in 1771 by the Swedish-German chemist Christian Weigel. By the mid-19th century, German chemist Justus von Liebig would provide his own improvements on the preceding designs of Weigel and Johann Friedrich August Göttling, with the device becoming known as the Liebig condenser.

== Principle of operation ==
A condenser is designed to transfer heat from a working fluid (e.g. water in a steam power plant) to a secondary fluid or the surrounding air. The condenser relies on the efficient heat transfer that occurs during phase changes, in this case during the condensation of a vapor into a liquid. The vapor typically enters the condenser at a temperature above that of the secondary fluid. As the vapor cools, it reaches the saturation temperature, condenses into liquid, and releases large quantities of latent heat. As this process occurs along the condenser, the quantity of vapor decreases and the quantity of liquid increases; at the outlet of the condenser, only liquid remains. Some condenser designs contain an additional length to subcool this condensed liquid below the saturation temperature.

Countless variations exist in condenser design, with design variables including the working fluid, the secondary fluid, the geometry, and the material. Common secondary fluids include water, air, refrigerants, or phase-change materials.

Condensers have two significant design advantages over other cooling technologies:

- Heat transfer by latent heat is much more efficient than heat transfer by sensible heat only
- The temperature of the working fluid stays relatively constant during condensation, which maximizes the temperature difference between the working and secondary fluid.

== Examples of condensers ==
=== Surface condenser ===
A surface condenser is one in which condensing medium and vapors are physically separated and used when direct contact is not desired. It is a shell and tube heat exchanger installed at the outlet of every steam turbine in thermal power stations. Commonly, the cooling water flows through the tube side and the steam enters the shell side where the condensation occurs on the outside of the heat transfer tubes. The condensate drips down and collects at the bottom, often in a built-in pan called a hotwell. The shell side often operates at a vacuum or partial vacuum, produced by the difference in specific volume between the steam and condensate. Conversely, the vapor can be fed through the tubes with the coolant water or air flowing around the outside.

=== Chemistry ===
In chemistry, a condenser is the apparatus that cools hot vapors, causing them to condense into a liquid. Examples include the Liebig condenser, Graham condenser, and Allihn condenser. This is not to be confused with a condensation reaction which links two fragments into a single molecule by an addition reaction and an elimination reaction.

In laboratory distillation, reflux, and rotary evaporators, several types of condensers are commonly used. The Liebig condenser is simply a straight tube within a cooling water jacket and is the simplest (and relatively least expensive) form of condenser. The Graham condenser is a spiral tube within a water jacket, and the Allihn condenser has a series of large and small constrictions on the inside tube, each increasing the surface area upon which the vapor constituents may condense. Being more complex shapes to manufacture, these latter types are also more expensive to purchase. These three types of condensers are laboratory glassware items since they are typically made of glass. Commercially available condensers usually are fitted with ground glass joints and come in standard lengths of 100, 200, and 400 mm. Air-cooled condensers are unjacketed, while water-cooled condensers contain a jacket for the water.

=== Industrial distillation ===
Larger condensers are also used in industrial-scale distillation processes to cool distilled vapor into liquid distillate. Commonly, the coolant flows through the tube side and distilled vapor through the shell side with distillate collecting at or flowing out the bottom.

=== Air conditioning ===
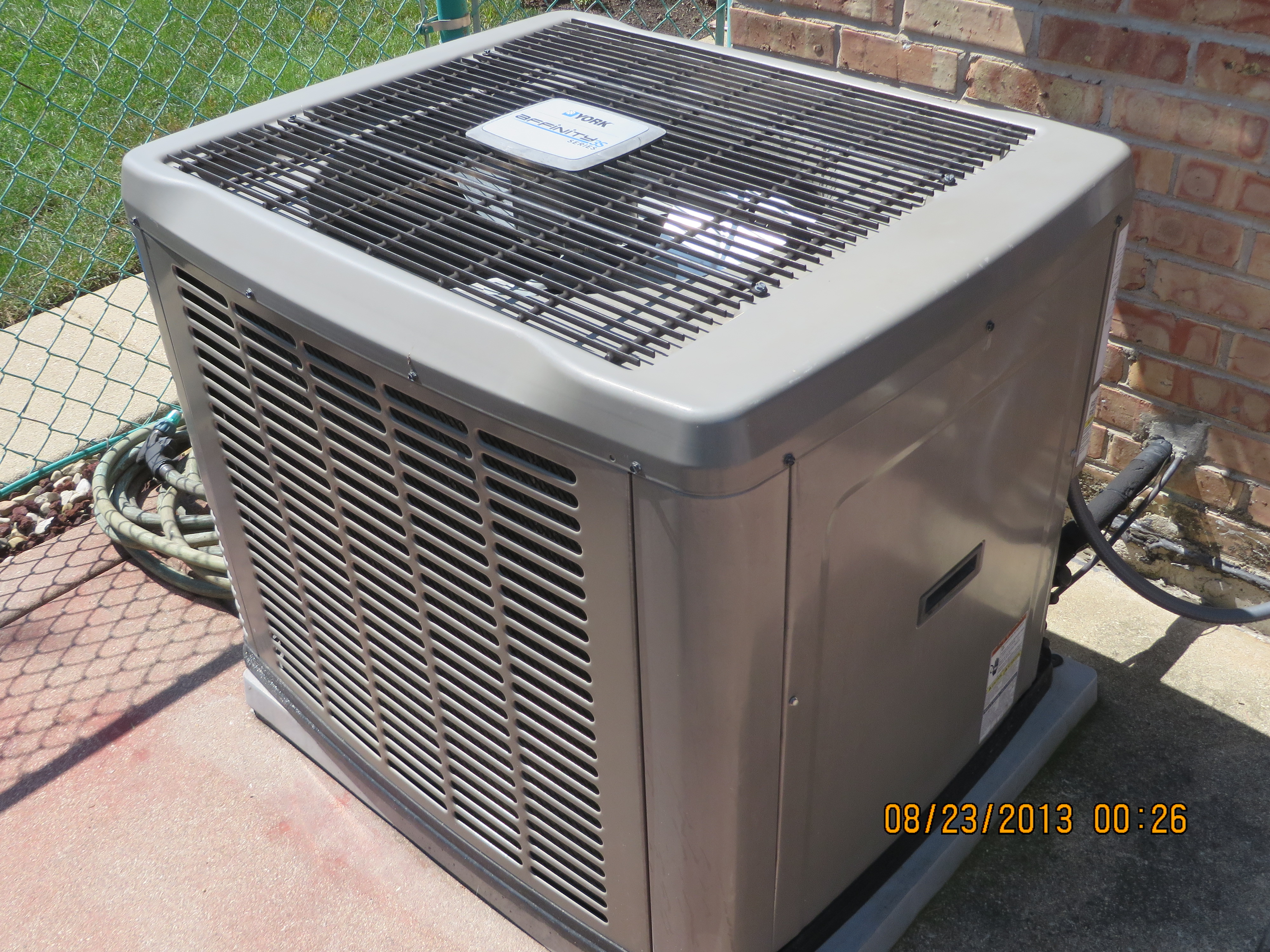
Condenser unit for central air conditioning for a typical house

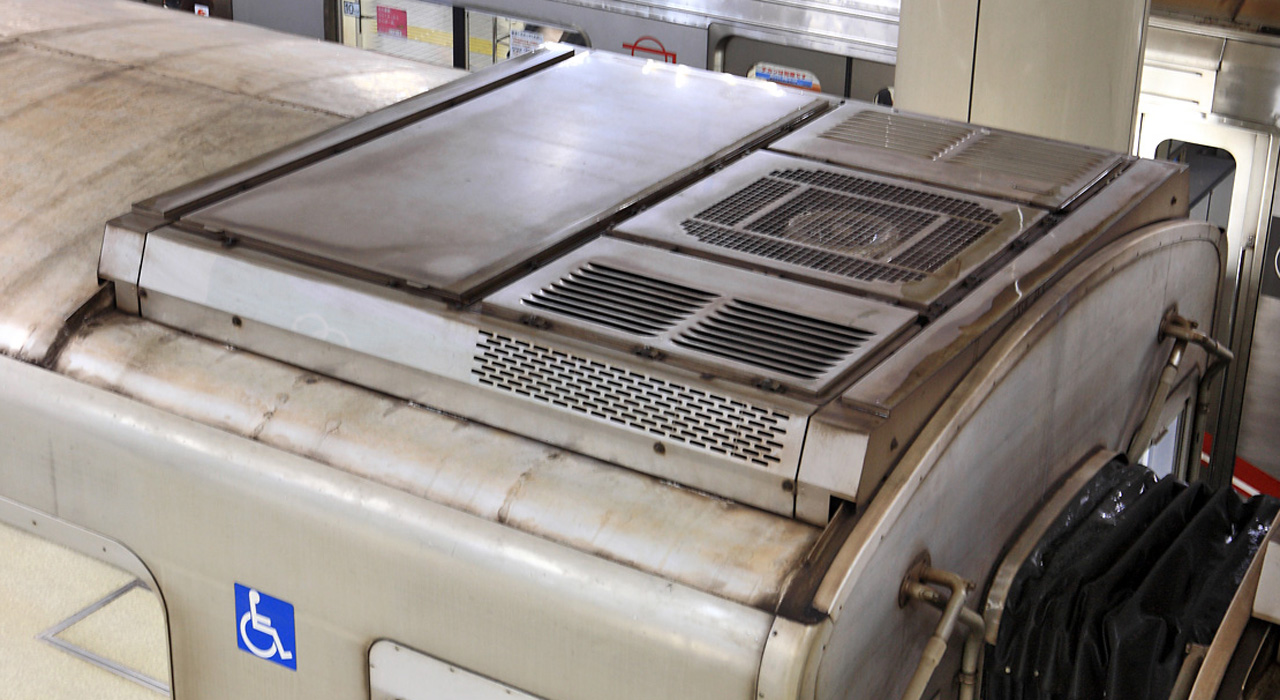
Rooftop condenser unit fitted on top of an Osaka Municipal Subway 10 series subway carriage (April 2008)

A condenser unit used in central air conditioning systems typically has a heat exchanger section to cool down and condense incoming refrigerant vapor into liquid, a compressor to raise the pressure of the refrigerant and move it along, and a fan for blowing outside air through the heat exchanger section to cool the refrigerant inside. A typical configuration of such a condenser unit is as follows: The heat exchanger section wraps around the sides of the unit with the compressor inside. In this heat exchanger section, the refrigerant goes through multiple tube passes, which are surrounded by heat transfer fins through which cooling air can circulate from outside to inside the unit. This also increases the surface area. There is a motorized fan inside the condenser unit near the top, which is covered by some grating to keep any objects from accidentally falling inside on the fan. The fan is used to pull outside cooling air in through the heat exchanger section at the sides and blow it out the top through the grating. These condenser units are located on the outside of the building they are trying to cool, with tubing between the unit and building, one for vapor refrigerant entering and another for liquid refrigerant leaving the unit. Of course, an electric power supply is needed for the compressor and fan inside the unit.

=== Direct-contact ===
In a direct-contact condenser, hot vapor and cool liquid are introduced into a vessel and allowed to mix directly, rather than being separated by a barrier such as the wall of a heat exchanger tube. The vapor gives up its latent heat and condenses to a liquid, while the liquid absorbs this heat and undergoes a temperature rise. The entering vapor and liquid typically contain a single condensable substance, such as a water spray being used to cool air and adjust its humidity.

== Equation ==
For an ideal single-pass condenser whose coolant has constant density, constant heat capacity, linear enthalpy over the temperature range, perfect cross-sectional heat transfer, and zero longitudinal heat transfer, and whose tubing has constant perimeter, constant thickness, and constant heat conductivity, and whose condensible fluid is perfectly mixed and at a constant temperature, the coolant temperature varies along its tube according to:

$$\Theta(x) = \frac{T_H-T(x)}{T_H-T(0)} = e^{-NTU} = e^{-\frac{h P x}{\dot{m} c}} = e^{-\frac{G x}{\dot{m} c L}}$$

where:

- $x$ is the distance from the coolant inlet
- $T(x)$ is the coolant temperature, and T(0) the coolant temperature at its inlet
- $T_H$ is the hot fluid's temperature
- $NTU$ is the number of transfer units
- $m$ is the coolant's mass (or other) flow rate
- $c$ is the coolant's heat capacity at constant pressure per unit mass (or other)
- $h$ is the heat transfer coefficient of the coolant tube
- $P$ is the perimeter of the coolant tube
- $G$ is the heat conductance of the coolant tube (often denoted $UA$)
- $L$ is the length of the coolant tube

== See also ==
- Condenser (laboratory)
- Air well (condenser)
