= Working fluid selection =

Pressurized gas or liquid in a heat engine

Heat engines, refrigeration cycles and heat pumps usually involve a fluid to and from which heat is transferred while undergoing a thermodynamic cycle. This fluid is called the working fluid. Refrigeration and heat pump technologies often refer to working fluids as refrigerants. Most thermodynamic cycles make use of the latent heat (advantages of phase change) of the working fluid. In case of other cycles the working fluid remains in gaseous phase while undergoing all the processes of the cycle. When it comes to heat engines, working fluid generally undergoes a combustion process as well, for example in internal combustion engines or gas turbines. There are also technologies in heat pump and refrigeration, where working fluid does not change phase, such as reverse Brayton or Stirling cycle.

This article summarises the main criteria of selecting working fluids for a thermodynamic cycle, such as heat engines including low grade heat recovery using Organic Rankine Cycle (ORC) for geothermal energy, waste heat, thermal solar energy or biomass and heat pumps and refrigeration cycles. The article addresses how working fluids affect technological applications, where the working fluid undergoes a phase transition and does not remain in its original (mainly gaseous) phase during all the processes of the thermodynamic cycle.

Finding the optimal working fluid for a given purpose – which is essential to achieve higher energy efficiency in the energy conversion systems – has great impact on the technology, namely it does not just influence operational variables of the cycle but also alters the layout and modifies the design of the equipment. Selection criteria of working fluids generally include thermodynamic and physical properties besides economical and environmental factors, but most often all of these criteria are used together.

== Selection criteria of working fluids ==
The choice of working fluids is known to have a significant impact on the thermodynamic as well as economic performance of the cycle. A suitable fluid must exhibit favorable physical, chemical, environmental, safety and economic properties such as low specific volume (high density), viscosity, toxicity, flammability, ozone depletion potential (ODP), global warming potential (GWP) and cost, as well as favorable process characteristics such as high thermal and exergetic efficiency. These requirements apply both to pure (single-component) and mixed (multicomponent) working fluids. Existing research is largely focused on the selection of pure working fluids, with vast number of published reports currently available. An important restriction of pure working fluids is their constant temperature profile during phase change. Working fluid mixtures are more appealing than pure fluids because their evaporation temperature profile is variable, therefore follows the profile of the heat source better, as opposed to the flat (constant) evaporation profile of pure fluids. This enables an approximately stable temperature difference during evaporation in the heat exchanger, coined as temperature glide, which significantly reduces exergetic losses. Despite their usefulness, recent publications addressing the selection of mixed fluids are considerably fewer.
Many authors like for example O. Badr et al. have suggested the following thermodynamic and physical criteria which a working fluid should meet for heat engines like Rankine cycles. There are some differences in the criteria concerning the working fluids used in heat engines and refrigeration cycles or heat pumps, which are listed below accordingly:

=== Common criteria for both heat engines and refrigeration cycles ===
1. The saturation pressure at the maximum temperature of the cycle should not be excessive. Very high pressures lead to mechanical stress problems, and therefore, unnecessarily expensive components may be required.
2. The saturation pressure at the minimum temperature of the cycle (i.e. the condensing pressure) should not be so low as to lead to problems of sealing against infiltration of the atmospheric air into the system.
3. The triple point should lie below the expected minimum ambient temperature. This ensures that the fluid does not solidify at any point during the cycle nor whilst being handled outside the system.
4. The working fluid should possess a low value of the liquid viscosity, a high latent heat of vaporisation, a high liquid thermal conductivity and a good wetting capability. These ensure that the working fluid pressure drops in passing through the heat exchangers and the auxiliary piping are low and that the heat transfer rates in the exchangers are high.
5. The working fluid should have low vapour and liquid specific volumes. These properties affect the rates of heat transfer in the heat exchangers. The vapour specific volume relates directly to the size and cost of the cycle components. Moreover, a high vapour specific volume leads to larger volumetric flows requiring a multiplicity of exhaust ends of the expander at heat engines or compressor in refrigeration cycles and resulting in significant pressure losses. The specific volume of the liquid at the condenser pressure should be as small as possible in order to minimise the required feedwater pump work.
6. Non-corrosivity and compatibility with common system materials are important selection criteria.
7. The fluid should be chemically stable over the whole temperature and pressure range employed. The thermal decomposition resistance of the working fluid in the presence of lubricants and container materials is a highly important criterion. In addition to making the replacement of the working fluid necessary, chemical decomposition of the fluid can produce non-condensable gases which lower the heat transfer rate in the heat exchangers, as well as compounds, which have corrosive effects on the materials of the system.
8. Non-toxicity, non-flammability, non-explosiveness, non-radioactiveness and current industrial acceptability are also desirable attributes.
9. The fluid should meet the criteria of environmental protection requirements such as a low grade ozone depletion potential (ODP) and global warming potential (GWP).
10. The fluid should possess good lubrication properties to reduce friction between surfaces in mutual contact, which reduces the heat generated when the surfaces move and ultimately increases cycle performance.
11. The substance should be of low cost and readily available in large quantities.
12. Long-term (operational) experience with the working fluid and possible fluid recycling is also beneficial.

=== Special criteria for heat engines (like Rankine cycle) ===
1. The critical temperature of the fluid should be well above the highest temperature existing in the proposed cycle. Evaporation of the working fluid — and thus the significant addition of heat — can then ensue at the maximum temperature of the cycle. This results in a relatively high cycle efficiency.
2. The slope ds/dT of the saturated vapour line in T–s diagram (see Chapter Classification of pure (single-component) working fluids) should be nearly zero in the applied pressure ratio of the expander. This prevents significant moisture (liquid droplet) formation or excessive superheat occurring during the expansion. It also ensures that all the heat rejection in the condenser occurs at the minimum cycle temperature, which increases the thermal efficiency.
3. A low value for the specific heat of the liquid or, alternatively, a low ratio of number of atoms per molecule divided by the molecular weight and a high ratio of the latent heat of vaporisation to the liquid's specific heat should appertain. This reduces the amount of the heat required to raise the temperature of the subcooled liquid of the working fluid to the saturation temperature corresponding to the pressure in the Rankinecycle's evaporator. So most of the heat is added at the maximum cycle temperature, and the Rankine cycle can approach more closely the Carnot cycle.

=== Special criteria for refrigeration cycles or heat pumps ===
1. The slope ds/dT of the saturated vapour line in T–s diagram (see Chapter Classification of pure (single-component) working fluids) should be nearly zero, but never positive in the applied pressure ratio of the compressor. This prevents significant moisture (liquid droplet) formation or excessive superheat occurring during the compression. Compressors are very sensitive to liquid droplets.
2. The saturation pressure at the temperature of evaporation should not be lower than atmospheric pressure. This mainly corresponds to open-type compressors.
3. The saturation pressure at the temperature of condensation should not be high.
4. The ratio of condensation and evaporation pressures should be low.

== Classification of pure (single-component) working fluids ==
=== Traditional classification ===
Traditional classification of pure working fluids. 1→2 shows isentropic expansions from saturated vapour states.

Traditional and presently most widespread categorisation of pure working fluids was first used by H. Tabor et al. and O. Badr et al. dating back to the 60s. This three-class classification system sorts pure working fluids into three categories. The base of the classification is the shape of the saturation vapour curve of the fluid in temperature-entropy plane. If the slope of the saturation vapour curve in all states is negative (ds/dT<0), which means that with decreasing saturation temperature the value of entropy increases, the fluid is called wet. If the slope of the saturation vapour curve of the fluid is mainly positive (regardless of a short negative slope somewhat below the critical point), which means that with decreasing saturation temperature the value of entropy also decreases (dT/ds>0), the fluid is dry. The third category is called isentropic, which means constant entropy and refers to those fluids that have a vertical saturation vapour curve (regardless of a short negative slope somewhat below the critical point) in temperature-entropy diagram. According to mathematical approach, it means a (negative) infinite slope (ds/dT=0). The terms of wet, dry and isentropic refer to the quality of vapour after the working fluid undergoes an isentropic (reversible adiabatic) expansion process from saturated vapour state. During an isentropic expansion process the working fluid always ends in the two-phase (also called wet) zone, if it is a wet-type fluid. If the fluid is of dry-type, the isentropic expansion necessarily ends in the superheated (also called dry) steam zone. If the working fluid is of isentropic-type, after an isentropic expansion process the fluid stays in saturated vapour state. The quality of vapour is a key factor in choosing steam turbine or expander for heat engines. See figure for better understanding.

=== Novel classification ===
Novel classification of pure working fluids.

Traditional classification shows several theoretical and practical deficiencies. One of the most important is the fact that no perfectly isentropic fluid exists. Isentropic fluids have two extrema (ds/dT=0) on the saturation vapour curve. Practically, there are some fluids which are very close to this behaviour or at least in a certain temperature range, for example trichlorofluoromethane (CCl_{3}F). Another problem is the extent of how dry or isentropic the fluid behaves, which has significant practical importance when designing for example an Organic Rankine Cycle layout and choosing proper expander. A new kind of classification was proposed by G. Györke et al. to resolve the problems and deficiencies of the traditional three-class classification system. The new classification is also based on the shape of the saturation vapour curve of the fluid in temperature-entropy diagram similarly to the traditional one. The classification uses a characteristic-point based method to differentiate the fluids. The method defines three primary and two secondary characteristic points. The relative location of these points on the temperature-entropy saturation curve defines the categories. Every pure fluid has primary characteristic points A, C and Z:

Compatibility of traditional and novel classification of pure working fluids. The shape of the saturated vapour curve of the fluid depends on the specific isochoric (molar) heat capacity (c_{v}) of that state via degrees of freedom (f) of the molecules.

- Primary point A and Z are the lowest temperature points on the saturation liquid and saturation vapour curve respectively. This temperature belongs to the melting point, which practically equals the triple point of the fluid. The choice of A and Z refers to the first and last point of the saturation curve visually.
- Primary point C refers to the critical point, which is an already well-defined thermodynamic property of the fluids.

The two secondary characteristic points, namely M and N are defined as local entropy extrema on the saturation vapour curve, more accurately, at those points, where with the decrease of the saturation temperature entropy stays constant: ds/dT=0. We can easily realise that considering traditional classification, wet-type fluids have only primary (A, C and Z), dry-type fluids have primary points and exactly one secondary point (M) and redefined isentropic-type fluids have both primary and secondary points (M and N) as well. See figure for better understanding.

The ascending order of entropy values of the characteristic points gives a useful tool to define categories. The mathematically possible number of orderings are 3! (if there are no secondary points), 4! (if only secondary point M exists) and 5! (if both secondary points exist), which makes it 150. There are some physical constraints including the existence of the secondary points decrease the number of possible categories to 8. The categories are to be named after the ascending order of the entropy of their characteristic points. Namely the possible 8 categories are ACZ, ACZM, AZCM, ANZCM, ANCZM, ANCMZ, ACNZM and ACNMZ. The categories (also called sequences) can be fitted into the traditional three-class classification, which makes the two classification system compatible. No working fluids have been found, which could be fitted into ACZM or ACNZM categories. Theoretical studies confirmed that these two categories may not even exist. Based on the database of NIST, the proved 6 sequences of the novel classification and their relation to the traditional one can be seen in the figure.

== Multicomponent working fluids ==
Although multicomponent working fluids have significant thermodynamic advantages over pure (single-component) ones, research and application keep focusing on pure working fluids. However, there are some typical examples for multicomponent based technologies such as Kalina cycle which uses water and ammonia mixture, or absorption refrigerators which also use water and ammonia mixture besides water, ammonia and hydrogen, lithium bromide or lithium chloride mixtures in a majority. Some scientific papers deal with the application of multicomponent working fluids in Organic Rankine cycles as well. These are mainly binary mixtures of hydrocarbons, fluorocarbons, hydrofluorocarbons, siloxanes and inorganic substances.

== See also ==
- Heat pump and refrigeration cycle
- Organic Rankine cycle
- Refrigerant
- Rankine cycle
- Thermodynamic cycle
- Vapor-compression refrigeration
