= Vapor quality =

Mass fraction of a saturated mixture which is vapor

In thermodynamics, vapor quality is the mass fraction that is vapor in a saturated mixture; in other words, saturated vapor has a "quality" of 100%, and saturated liquid has a "quality" of 0%. Vapor quality is an intensive property which can be used in conjunction with other independent intensive properties to specify the thermodynamic state of the working fluid of a thermodynamic system. It has no meaning for substances which are not saturated mixtures (for example, compressed liquids or superheated fluids). Vapor quality is an important quantity during the adiabatic expansion step in various thermodynamic cycles (like Organic Rankine cycle, Rankine cycle, etc.). Working fluids can be classified by using the appearance of droplets in the vapor during the expansion step.

Quality χ can be calculated by dividing the mass of the vapor by the mass of the total mixture:
$$\chi = \frac{m_\text{vapor}}{m_\text{total}}$$
where m indicates mass.

Another definition used in chemical engineering defines quality (q) of a fluid as the fraction that is saturated liquid. By this definition, a saturated liquid has q = 0. A saturated vapor has q = 1.

An alternative definition is the 'equilibrium thermodynamic quality'. It can be used only for single-component mixtures (e.g. water with steam), and can take values < 0 (for sub-cooled fluids) and > 1 (for super-heated vapors):

$$\chi_{\text{eq}} = \frac{h-h_{f}}{h_{fg}}$$
where h is the mixture specific enthalpy, defined as:
$$h = \frac{m_f \cdot h_f + m_g \cdot h_g}{m_f+m_g}.$$

Subscripts f and g refer to saturated liquid and saturated gas respectively, and fg refers to vaporization.

== Calculation ==
The above expression for vapor quality can be expressed as:
$$\chi = \frac{y - y_f}{y_g - y_f}$$
where $y$ is equal to either specific enthalpy, specific entropy, specific volume or specific internal energy, $y_f$ is the value of the specific property of saturated liquid state and $y_g - y_f$ is the value of the specific property of the substance in dome zone, which we can find both liquid $y_f$ and vapor $y_g$.

Another expression of the same concept is:
$$\chi=\frac{m_v}{m_l + m_v}$$
where $m_v$ is the vapor mass and $m_l$ is the liquid mass.

== Steam quality and work ==
The origin of the idea of vapor quality was derived from the origins of thermodynamics, where an important application was the steam engine. Low quality steam would contain a high moisture percentage and therefore damage components more easily. High quality steam would not corrode the steam engine. Steam engines use water vapor (steam) to push pistons or turbines, and that movement creates work. The quantitatively described steam quality (steam dryness) is the proportion of saturated steam in a saturated water/steam mixture. In other words, a steam quality of 0 indicates 100% liquid, while a steam quality of 1 (or 100%) indicates 100% steam.

The quality of steam on which steam whistles are blown is variable and may affect frequency. Steam quality determines the velocity of sound, which declines with decreasing dryness due to the inertia of the liquid phase. Also, the specific volume of steam for a given temperature decreases with decreasing dryness.

Steam quality is very useful in determining enthalpy of saturated water/steam mixtures, since the enthalpy of steam (gaseous state) is typically several times higher than the enthalpy of water (liquid state), depending on temperature.
