= Naphtha launch =

Small motorboat used in the late-19th-century United States

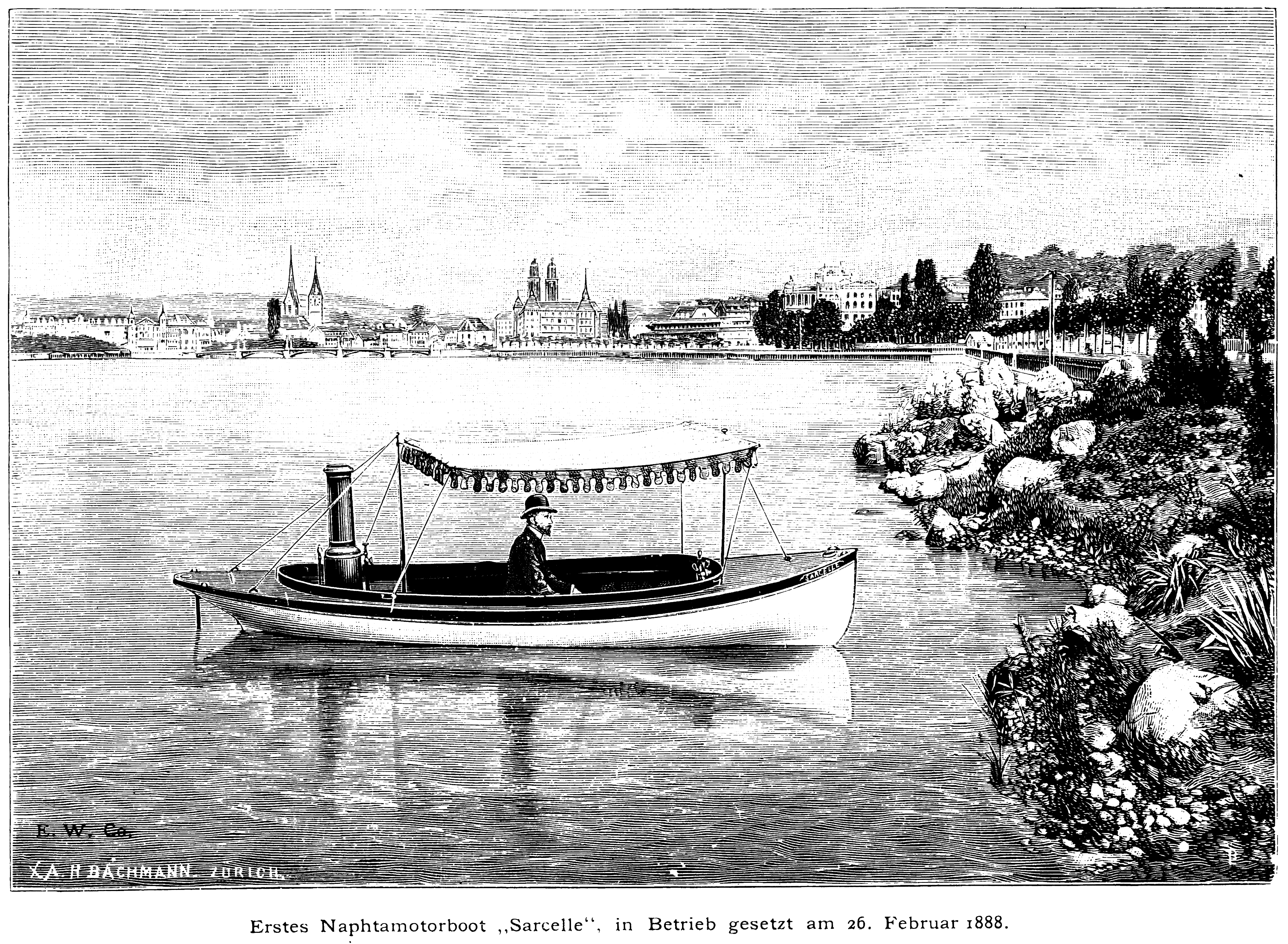
An Escher Wyss launch of 1888

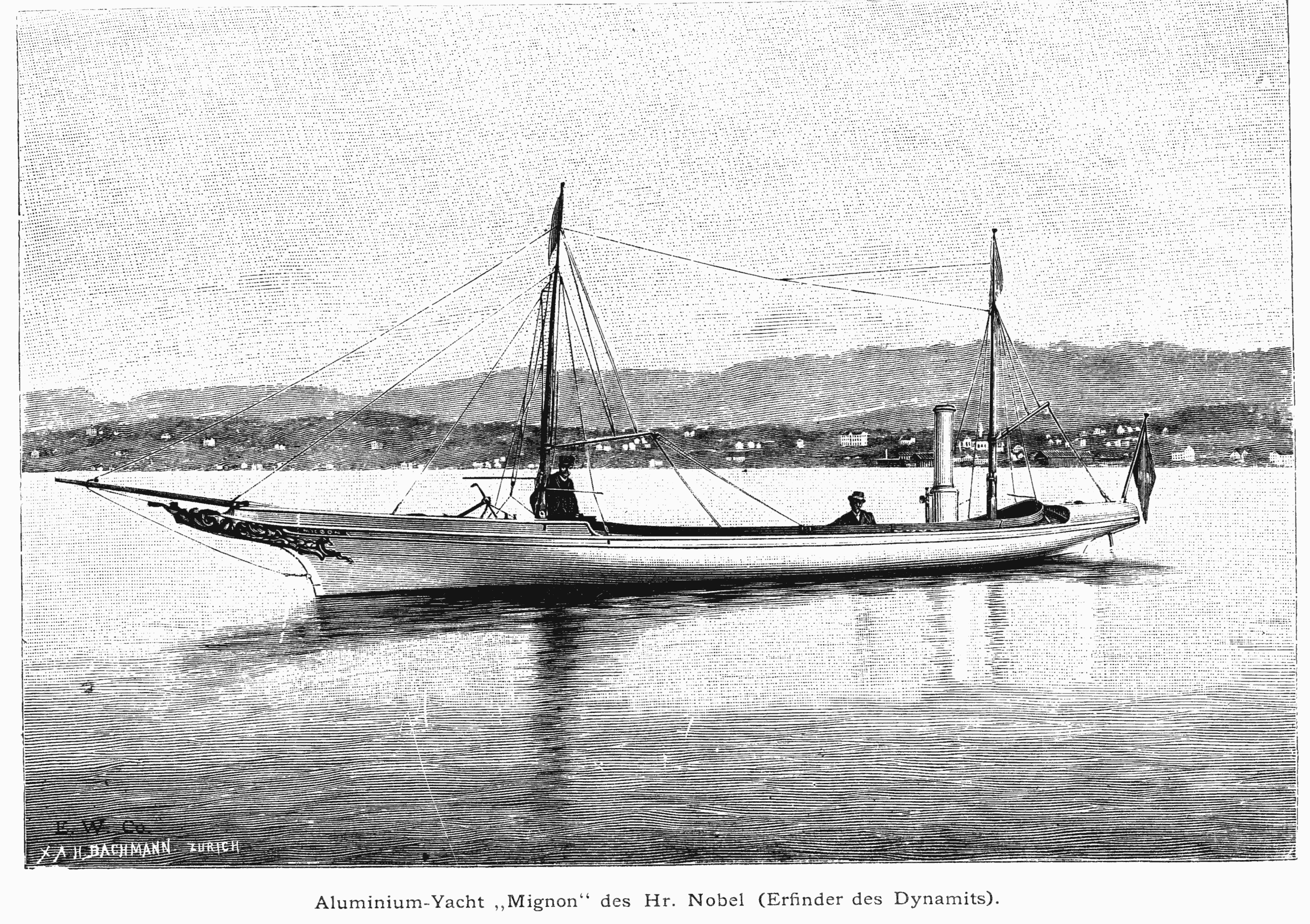
Alfred Nobel's aluminium-hulled sloop Mignon

A naphtha launch, sometimes called a "vapor launch", was a small motor launch, powered by a naphtha engine. They were a particularly American design, brought into being by a local law that made it impractical to use a steam launch for private use.

== Naphtha launches ==
By the 1880s, the small steam engine was well established as a power unit for small steam launches, as well as for large boats. However US law, prompted by some past boiler explosions, required that all steam boats carry a licensed engineer at all times. Although this was no difficulty for a commercial craft, it prevented small steam launches from being used for personal and recreational purposes. Becoming such an engineer required an apprenticeship of two years beforehand. One of the few amateurs to achieve this and to become their own engineer was Rosamund Burgess, wife of boat designer Starling Burgess.

A more popular alternative to the steam launch was the naphtha launch, which used an alternative power source. Advertisements of the period used the deliberate phrase, "Every Man His own Engineer!" to highlight this legal restriction.

=== Origins ===
The first naphtha launch appears to have been British, reported in the French journal La Nature in 1888. This launch, Zephyr, was the invention of Alfred Yarrow, a well-known builder of steam launches for some years previously. Similar launches were produced in the same year by the Swiss company Escher Wyss AG. One of these was Alfred Nobel's graceful aluminium-hulled sloop Mignon, of 1892. Another, also of aluminium, was the Aluminia of 1894.

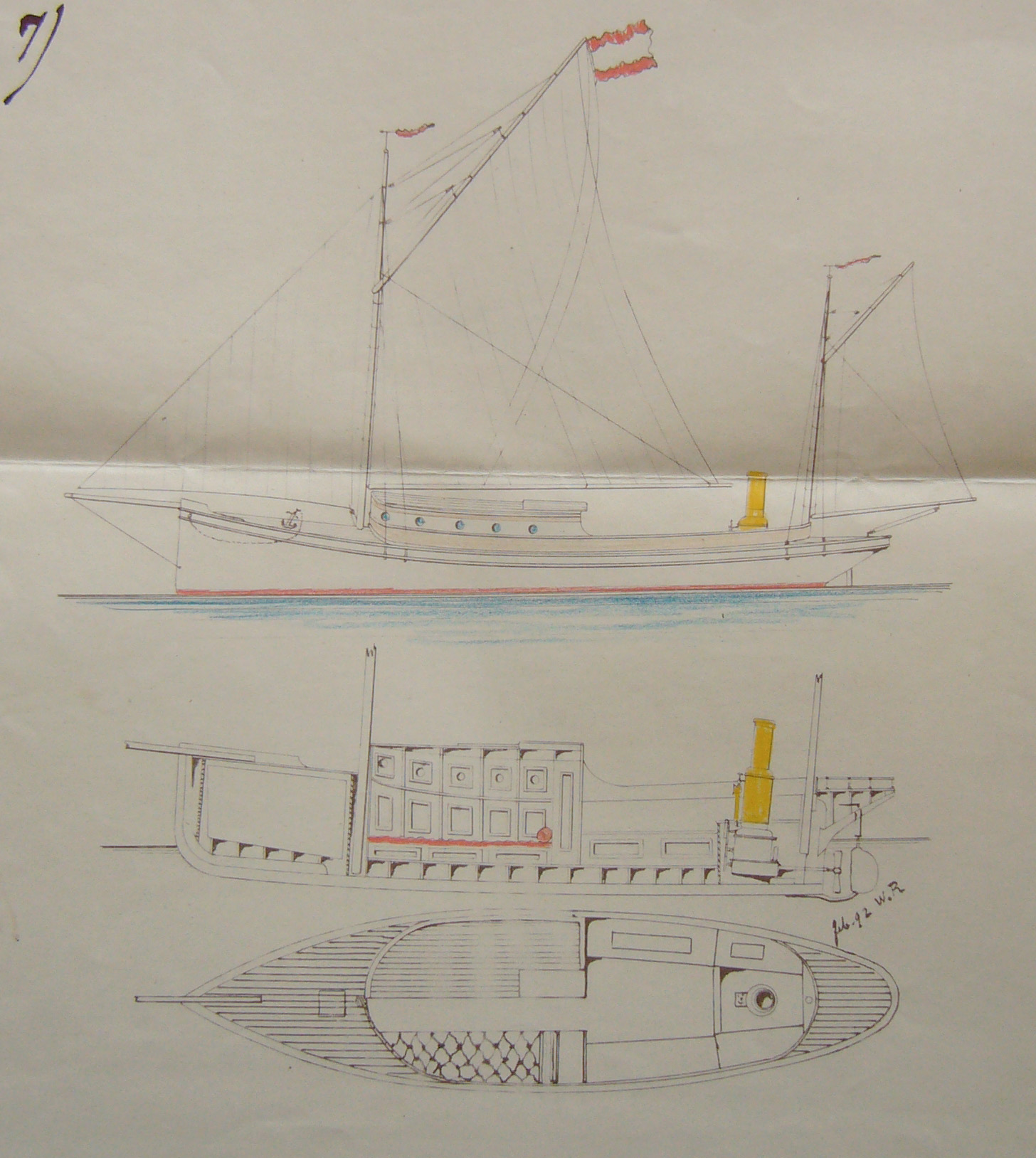
Aluminia

The first American naphtha launches recorded were those of the Ofeldt company of New York, who would later become well known as makers of naphtha engines. They described this as the 'Essh' system, and may have been licensees of the Escher Wyss patents. As well as Ofeldt, complete launches were also offered by the Gas Engine and Power Co. of New York. By 1890 they claimed to have sold over 500.

=== Typical launches ===
The typical naphtha launch was an open launch of around 24 feet (7.3 m) in length. These were pleasure craft intended for use on fine-weather excursions. After all, a commercial boat with a professional crew would not suffer from the regulatory problem that led to their invention. Naphtha launches appeared in the finest circles, in the best yacht clubs and under the ownership of some celebrated names.

=== Surviving examples ===
Few examples survive today. Some sources claim one, others four.

- "Naphtha Launch 'Frieda'". Minnesota Lakes Maritime Museum. Archived from the original on 2008-07-23. "This sleek 22' long craft is believed to be one of only four in existence."
- "Antique Boat Museum". Antique Boat Museum, New York. Archived from the original on 2009-01-03.

== Naphtha engine ==
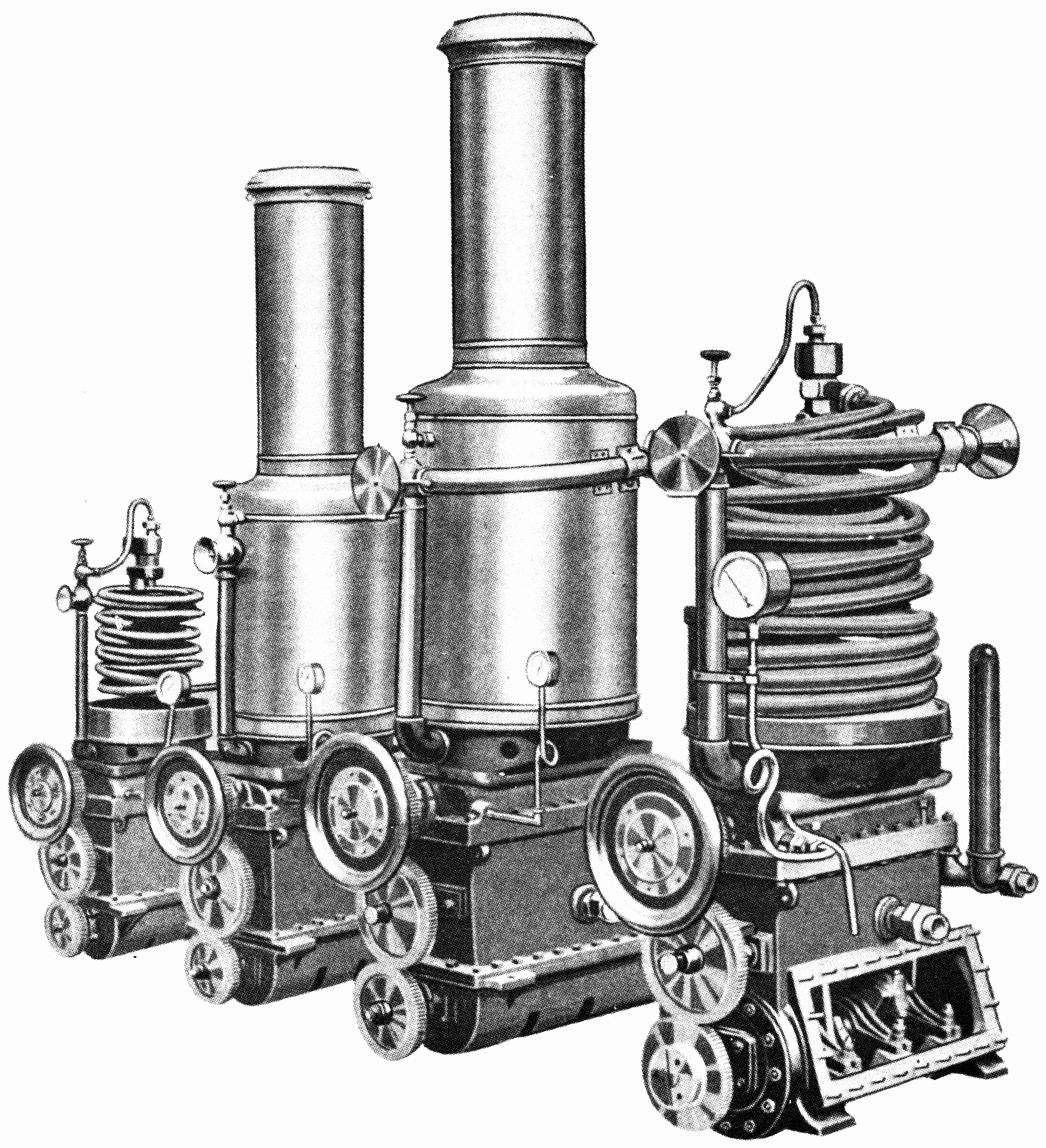
Naptha engines in a range of sizes

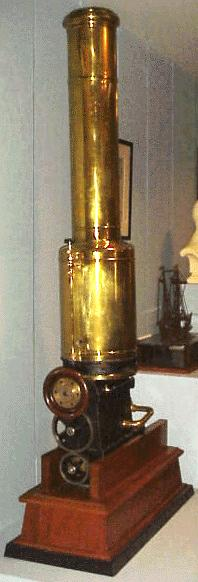
Naphtha engine built by the Gas Engine & Power Company of New York; at The Mariners Museum

The naphtha engine is an external combustion engine, generally similar to the type of small steam engine already in use for steam launches. The working fluid is naphtha, which unusually is also used as a liquid fuel to power the boiler. Appearance is similar to a steam launch, having a small vertical boiler and vertical cylinders.

The burner for a naphtha engine uses naphtha itself, and is similar to that used for steam cars. Although such convenient and self-regulating liquid fuel burners were also used on steam launches, most launches at the time of the naphtha engine's heyday were still using solid fuel.

=== General arrangement ===
To avoid problems of premature condensation, the engine and boiler units were mounted together. Engines were three-cylinder single-acting vertical simple expansion engines, with 120° crankshaft spacing, so as to be self-starting without dead centre problems. (Note: Other configurations would have been possible, but none are known at this time.)

=== Boiler ===
The boilers were of spiral monotube form. These were single-pass 'water-tube' [sic] steam generators, where liquid at one end of the tube boiled by the time it reached the end, without any looped circulation. Similar boilers, although with conventional water and steam, were also used for steam cars such as the White. The boiler was mounted directly atop the engine, and encased in a polished brass or copper casing with a short funnel above. The purpose of the funnel was merely to vent fumes above the heads of passengers, rather than to act as a draught to draw the fire.

=== Burner ===
Unlike coal or wood, the jet burners used did not require additional draught. (Note: This short chimney, compared to that of a steam launch, is an identification feature for naphtha launches in old photographs.) The boiler was fired with a pressure jet burner, a small quantity of pressurised naphtha being tapped off from the boiler. A prominent tube and funnel on the front of the boiler casing (sometimes mistaken for a whistle) is the air inlet. The fuel jet mixes with the downwards air flow in this vertical tube, then the mixed air and fuel is fed to a ring-shaped burner inside the boiler casing. For starting, a hand air pump was used to pressurise the fuel tank and encourage fuel flow, together with pre-heating of the burner coil by lighting a little of the fuel in a tray below it.

There was no throttle valve or regulator to control the engine speed. As was commonly used on single-pass spiral monotube boilers, the burner output was regulated instead with the fuel valve and the boiler responded quickly enough for this to be sufficient.

=== Engine ===
Lubrication of the engine was performed by the fuel itself, collected in a sealed wet sump arrangement beneath the crankcase. The naphtha fuel (Note: The fuel of this period was closer to modern paraffin or kerosene than what we would know today as gasoline or petrol.) was an acceptable lubricant and this avoided the problem of separating lubricating oil from condensed fuel vapour leaking past the piston ring seals. It did however require careful sealing of the crankcase.

The engine valvegear was simple, compared to that of contemporary steam engines. A single rotating overhead camshaft ran above the cylinders, parallel to the crankshaft. Eccentrics on this shaft actuated a transverse slide valve for each cylinder. The valve camshaft was driven at engine speed (Note: The camshaft operated at engine crankshaft speed, like a steam engine or two-stroke engine, but unlike the camshaft of a four-stroke engine that runs at half crankshaft speed.) by gears from the crankshaft. A prominent handwheel on the camshaft allowed the engine to be reversed, in a similar manner to slip-eccentric valve gear by shifting the phase of the camshaft relative to the crankshaft.

=== Condensers ===
External water-cooled condensers were used, simple pipes run under the hull, along the length of the keel. Despite the obvious risks of damage from grounding, these seem to have given little trouble in service. The fuel tank was in the fo'csle of the boat, well away from the engine and risk of fire. This fuel tank was pressurised by the returning naphtha, avoiding the need for a fuel pump.

=== Low boiling point ===
One of the attractive features that first led inventors to consider naphtha as a working fluid was its low boiling point, compared to water. This allows a relatively simple engine to be constructed, although it actually represents a limitation on the efficiency of such an engine. At the time, thermodynamics was already an advanced science and the limitations of thermodynamic cycles were well understood by physicists, if not by all engineers. By limiting the range of temperatures between which the engine worked, this actually reduces the potential efficiency of the engine, rather than increasing it.

An earlier use of low boiling point fluids had been Du Tremblay's ether engine of the 1850s. This was used for a bottoming cycle as an addition to a steam engine. Waste heat rejected through the condenser of the steam engine was used to boil ether and drive a second cylinder.

=== Other variants ===
==== Frank W. Ofeldt ====
Swedish-American inventor Frank Waldemar Ofeldt (1836–1904) also designed the Alco Vapor engine, sold by the Alco Vapor Launch Co. This burned kerosene and used alcohol (probably 'wood alcohol' or methanol) as a working fluid. This may have been a measure to avoid the Escher Wyss patents.

Later Ofeldt also designed a more conventional steam-generating water-tube steam boiler. This was similar to the "Lune Valley" pattern, a central drum surrounded by coiled water tubes, but with irregular wedge-shaped coils rather than a simple circle.

==== 'Simplex' engine ====
The "Simplex Naptha engine" built by Chas. Willard of Chicago was more akin to an internal combustion gas engine with timed spark ignition. It is outside the scope of this article.

=== Hazards and explosions ===
Despite the obvious hazards and occasional reports of fires, (Note: The 12 tonner Bertha E. Hedtler burned at Ram Island in the Merrimack River in Massachusetts in August 1903.) the naphtha launch appears to have worked reasonably well and safely.

=== Models ===
The naphtha engine is not well known amongst model engineers, but at least one detailed reproduction has been constructed.

== In popular culture ==
In the 1921 novel of the popular Tom Swift series, Tom Swift Among the Fire Fighters, the hero rescues passengers with the aid of a naphtha launch, describing it as "old-fashioned". The author also passes comment as to them being "a trifle treacherous" to light.

== Naphthalene locomotive ==
A railway locomotive using solid naphthalene was built by Schneider-Creusot in France in 1913. This had no relation to the naphtha engine. It was a 70 bhp internal combustion engine, similar to a petrol-paraffin engine, which operated as a petrol engine and once started and warmed up could be switched to naphthalene simply as a cheaper fuel. The naphthalene was melted and vaporised by a water jacket, heated by the engine.

== See also ==
- Organic Rankine cycle
