= Steam whistle =

Audible warning device powered by steam

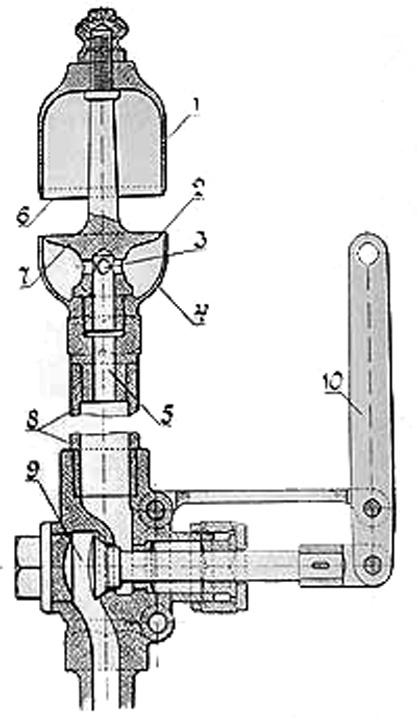

A steam whistle is a device used to produce sound in the form of a whistle using pressurized steam, which creates, projects, and amplifies its sound by acting as a vibrating system.

== Operation ==
A recording of a mass blow of traction engine steam whistles

The whistle consists of the following main parts, as seen on the drawing: the whistle bell (1), the steam orifice or aperture (2), and the valve (9).

When the lever (10) is actuated (usually via a pull cord), the valve opens and lets the steam escape through the orifice. The steam will alternately compress and rarefy in the bell, creating the sound. The pitch, or tone, is dependent on the length of the bell and how far the operator has opened the valve. Some locomotive engineers invented their own distinctive style of whistling.

== Uses of steam whistles ==
Steam whistles are often used on buildings such as factories, universities, and similar places to signal the start or end of a work shift, etc. Steam railway locomotives, traction engines, and steam ships have traditionally been fitted with a steam whistle for warning and communication purposes. Large diameter, low-pitched steam whistles were used on light houses, likely beginning in the 1850s.

The earliest use of steam whistles was as boiler low-water alarms in the 18th century and early 19th century. During the 1830s, whistles were adopted by railroads and steamship companies.

=== Gallery ===
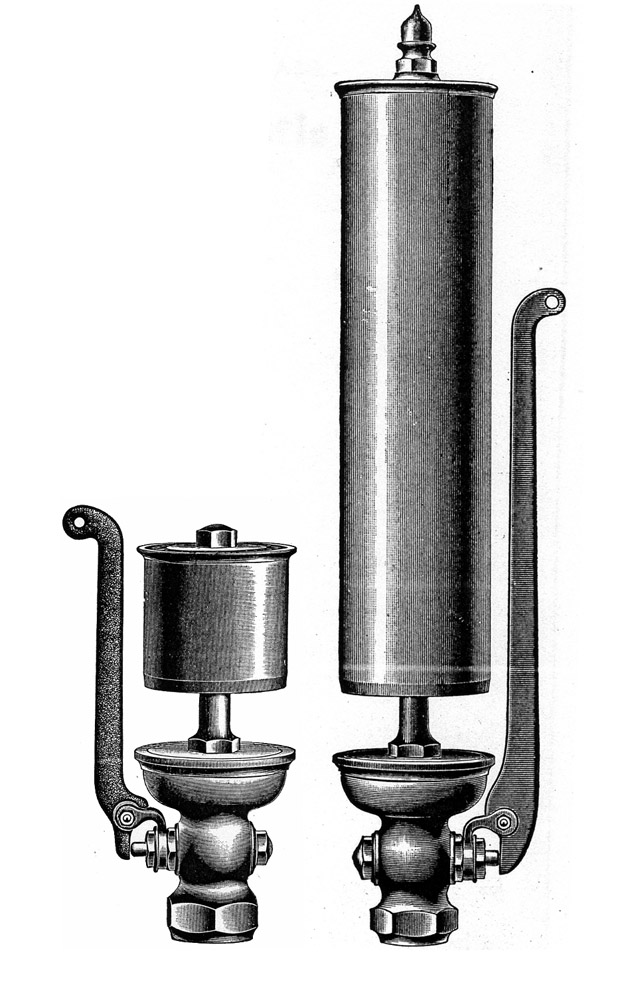
High-pitched plain whistle (left) and low-pitched plain whistle (right)

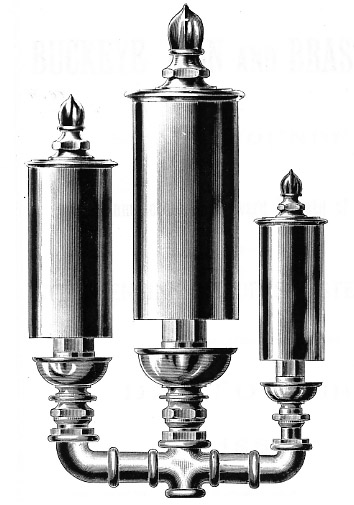
3-bell multi-tone (chime) whistle sounds a musical chord

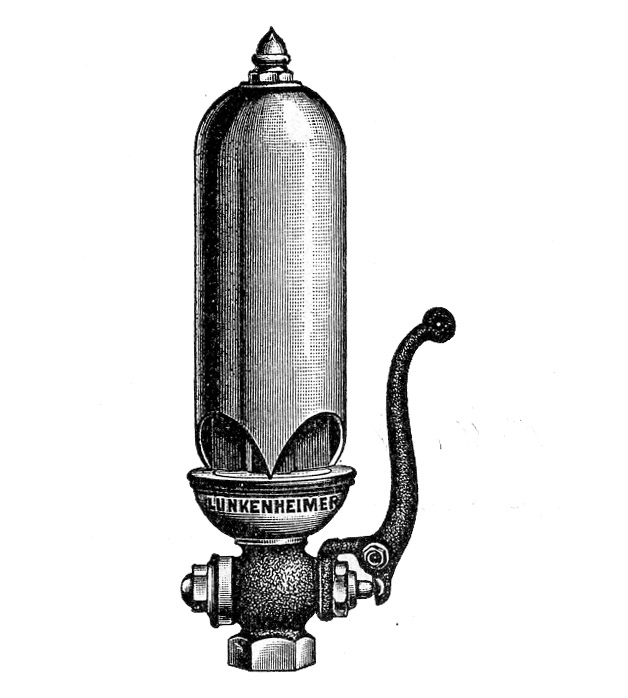
Single-bell multi-tone (chime) whistle with compartments of differing length and pitch tuned to a musical chord

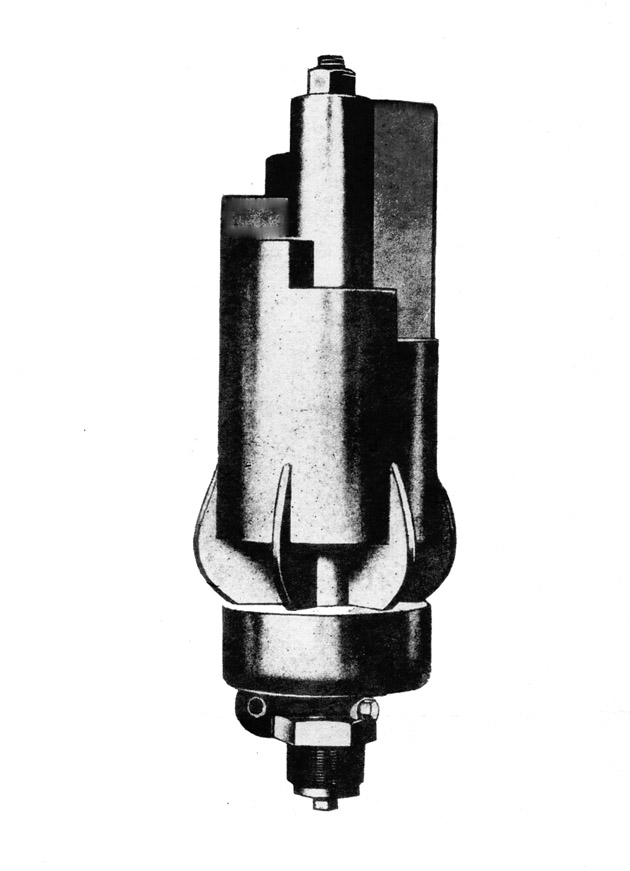
6-note "step-top" multi-tone (chime) whistle with 6 compartments of differing length and pitch. The mouth of each chamber is partially walled

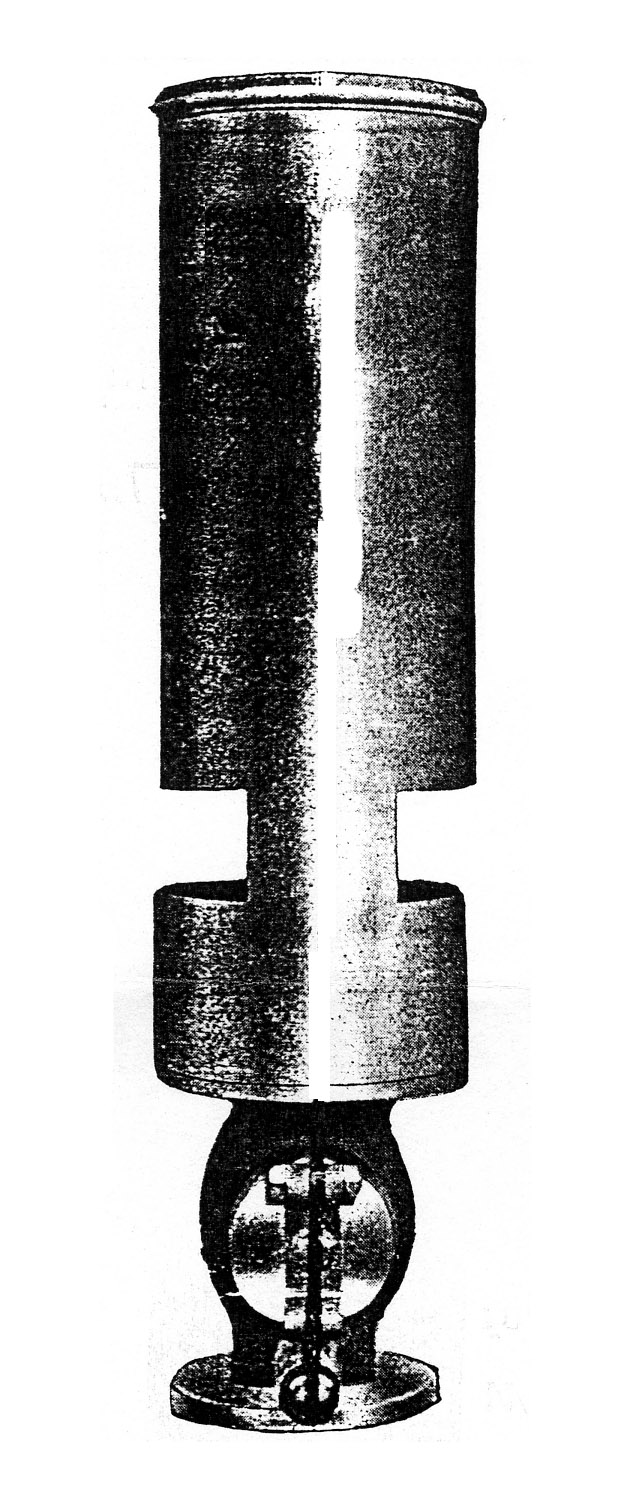
A partial mouth whistle ("organ whistle") in which the mouth extends less than 360 degrees around the whistle circumference

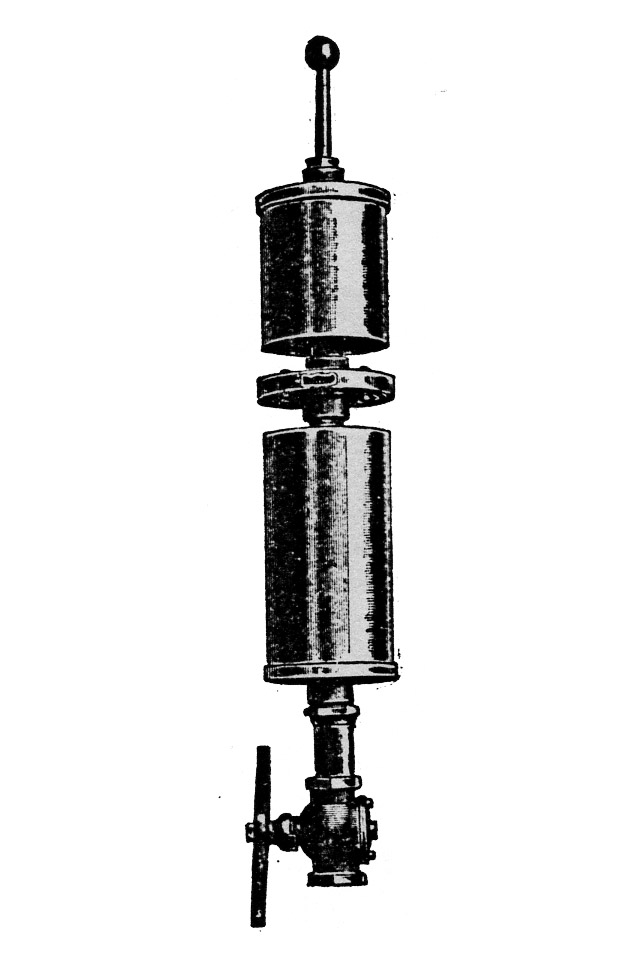
"Gong" chime whistle, two whistles aligned on the same axis

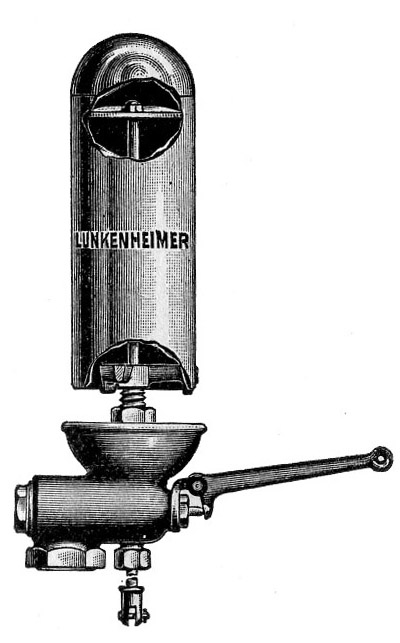
Variable pitch whistle; note the internal piston used for adjusting pitch

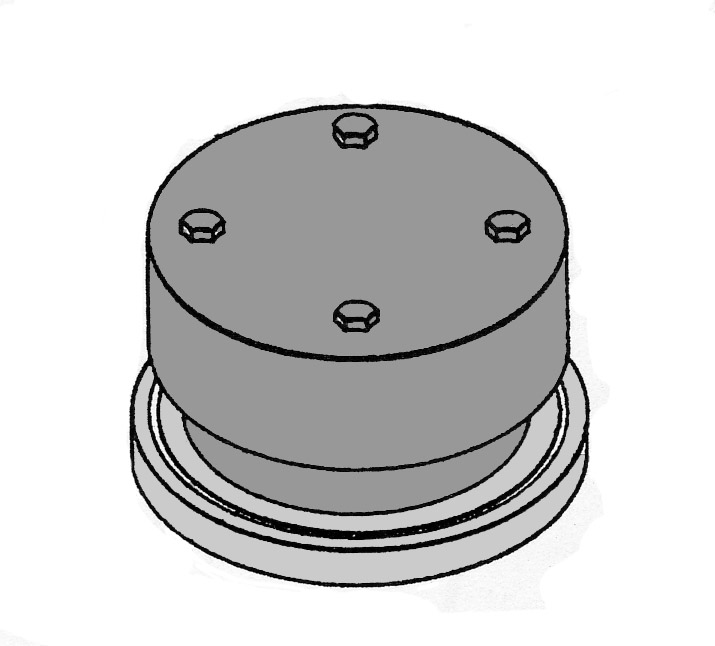
“Ultrawhistle” with ring-shaped bell cavity

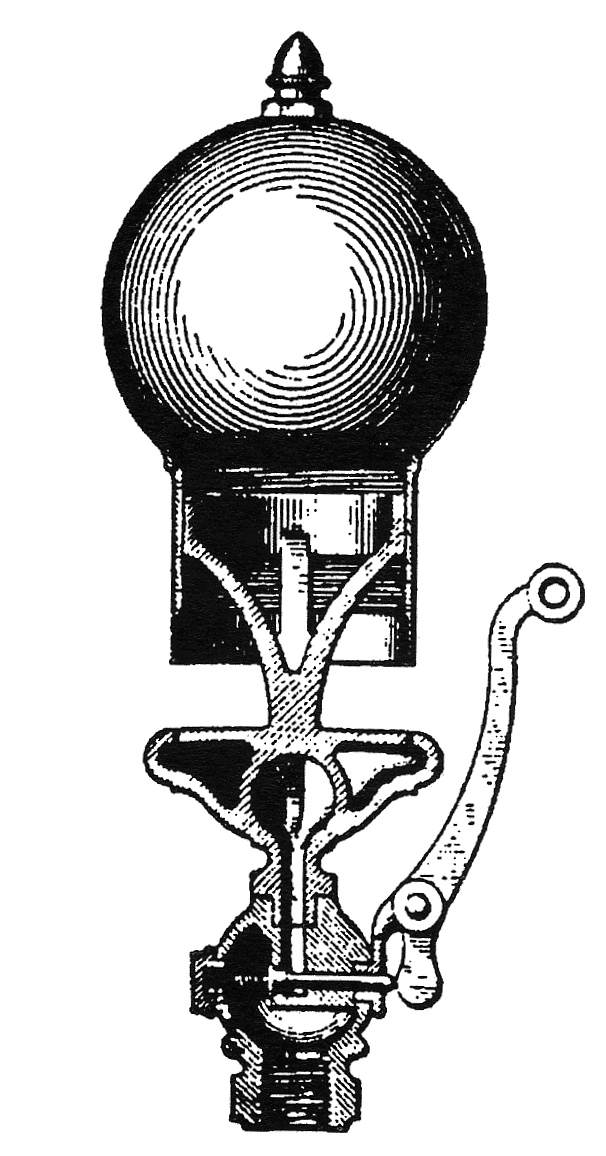
Helmholtz whistle has a low pitch relative to its length

=== Railway whistles ===
Steam warning devices have been used on trains since 1833, when George Stephenson invented and patented a steam trumpet for use on the Leicester and Swannington Railway. Period literature makes a distinction between a steam trumpet and a steam whistle. A copy of the trumpet drawing signed May 1833 shows a device about eighteen inches high with an ever-widening trumpet shape with a six-inch diameter at its top or mouth. It is said that George Stephenson invented his trumpet after an accident on the Leicester and Swannington Railway where a train hit either a cart, or a herd of cows, on a level crossing and there were calls for a better way of giving a warning. Although no-one was injured, the accident was deemed serious enough to warrant Stephenson's personal intervention. One account states that [driver] Weatherburn had 'mouthblown his horn' at the crossing in an attempt to prevent the accident, but that no attention had been paid to this audible warning, perhaps because it had not been heard.

Stephenson subsequently called a meeting of directors and accepted the suggestion of the company manager, Ashlin Bagster, that a horn or whistle which could be activated by steam should be constructed and fixed to the locomotives. Stephenson later visited a musical instrument maker on Duke Street in Leicester, who on Stephenson's instructions constructed a 'Steam Trumpet' which was tried out in the presence of the board of Directors ten days later.

Stephenson mounted the trumpet on the top of the boiler's steam dome, which delivers dry steam to the cylinders. The company went on to mount the device on its other locomotives

Locomotive steam trumpets were soon replaced by steam whistles. Air whistles were used on some diesel and electric locomotives, but these mostly employ air horns.

=== Music ===
An array of steam whistles arranged to play music is referred to as a calliope.

In York, Pennsylvania, a variable pitch steam whistle at the New York Wire Company has been played annually on Christmas Eve since 1925 (except in 1986 and 2005) in what has come to be known as "York's Annual Steam Whistle Christmas Concert". On windy nights, area residents report hearing the concert as far as 12 to 15 miles away. The whistle, which is in the Guinness Book of World Records, was powered by an air compressor during the 2010 concert due to the costs of maintaining and running the boiler.

=== Lighthouse fog signals ===
Beginning in 1869, steam whistles began being installed at lighthouse stations as a way of warning mariners in periods of fog, when the lighthouse is not visible. 10" diameter whistles were used as fog signals throughout the United States for many years, until they were later replaced by other compressed air diaphragm or diaphone horns.

== Types of whistles ==
- Plain whistle – an inverted cup mounted on a stem, as in the illustration above. In Europe, railway steam whistles were typically loud, shrill, single-note plain whistles. In the UK, locomotives were usually fitted with only one or two of these whistles, the latter having different tones and being controlled individually to allow more complex signalling. On railroads in Finland, two single-note whistles were used on every engine; one shrill, one of a lower tone. They were used for different signaling purposes. The Deutsche Reichsbahn of Germany introduced another whistle design in the 1920s called "Einheitspfeife", conceived as a single-note plain whistle which already had a very deep-pitched and loud sound, but if the whistle trigger is just pulled down half of its way an even lower tone like from a chime-whistle could also be caused. This whistle is the reason for the typical "long high - short low - short high" signal sound of steam locomotives in Germany.
- Chime whistle – two or more resonant bells or chambers that sound simultaneously. In America, railway steam whistles were typically compact chime whistles with more than one whistle contained within, creating a chord. In Australia the New South Wales Government Railways after the 1924 re-classification many steam locomotives either had 5 chimes whistles that sound similar to the Star Brass 5-chime fitted (this include many locomotives from the pre 1924 re-classification, or were built new with 5 chime whistles. 3-chimes (3 compact whistles within one) were very popular, as well as 5-chimes, and 6-chimes. In some cases chime whistles were used in Europe. Ships such as the Titanic were equipped with chimes consisting of three separate whistles (in the case of the Titanic the whistles measured 9, 12, and 15 inches diameter). The Japanese National Railways used a chime whistle that sounds like a very deep single-note plain whistle, because the chords where just accessed in a simple parallel circuit if the whistle trigger is pulled down.
- Organ whistle – a whistle with mouths cut in the side, usually a long whistle in relation to diameter, hence the name. These whistle were very common on steamships, especially those manufactured in the UK.
- Gong – two whistles facing in opposite directions on a common axis. These were popular as factory whistles. Some were composed of three whistle chimes.
- Variable pitch whistle – a whistle containing an internal piston available for changing pitch. This whistle type could be made to sound like a siren or to play a melody. Often called a fire alarm whistle, wildcat whistle, or mocking bird whistle.
- Toroidal or Levavasseur whistle – a whistle with a torus-shaped (doughnut-shaped) resonant cavity paralleling the annular gas orifice, named after Robert Levavasseur, its inventor. Unlike a conventional whistle, the diameter (and sound level) of a ring-shaped whistle can be increased without altering resonance chamber cross-sectional area (preserving frequency), allowing construction of a very large diameter high frequency whistle. The frequency of a conventional whistle declines as diameter is increased. Other ring-shaped whistles include the Hall-Teichmann whistle, Graber whistle, Ultrawhistle, and Dynawhistle.
- Helmholtz whistle – a whistle with a cross-sectional area exceeding that of the whistle bell opening, often shaped like a bottle or incandescent light bulb. The frequency of this whistle relative to its size is lower than that of a conventional whistle and therefore these whistles have found application in small gauge steam locomotives. Also termed a Bangham whistle.
- Hooter whistle - a single note whistle of greater diameter with a longer bell, resulting in a deeper “hoot” sound when blown. These found use in rail, marine, and industrial applications. In the United States, the Norfolk and Western Railway made extensive use of these kinds of whistles and were noted for the squeaks and chirps produced when blown in addition to their low pitch. In Scotland, the Caledonian Railway was noteworthy for its usage of the "hooter" whistle.

== Whistle acoustics ==
=== Resonant frequency ===
A whistle has a characteristic natural resonant frequency that can be detected by gently blowing human breath across the whistle rim, much as one might blow over the mouth of a bottle. The active sounding frequency (when the whistle is blown on steam) may differ from the natural frequency as discussed below. These comments apply to whistles with a mouth area at least equal to the cross-sectional area of the whistle.

- Whistle length – The natural resonant frequency decreases as the length of the whistle is increased. Doubling the effective length of a whistle reduces the frequency by one half, assuming that the whistle cross-sectional area is uniform. A whistle is a quarter-wave generator, which means that a sound wave generated by a whistle is about four times the whistle length. If the speed of sound in the steam supplied to a whistle were 15936 inches per second, a pipe with a 15-inch effective length blowing its natural frequency would sound near middle C: 15936/(4 x 15) = 266 Hz. When a whistle is sounding its natural frequency, the effective length referred to here is somewhat longer than the physical length above the mouth if the whistle is of uniform cross-sectional area. That is, the vibrating length of the whistle includes some portion of the mouth. This effect (the “end correction”) is caused by the vibrating steam inside the whistle engaging vibration of some steam outside the enclosed pipe, where there is a transition from plane waves to spherical waves. Formulas are available to estimate the effective length of a whistle, but an accurate formula to predict sounding frequency would have to incorporate whistle length, scale, gas flow rate, mouth height, and mouth wall area (see below).
- Blowing pressure – Frequency increases with blowing pressure, which determines gas volume flow through the whistle, allowing a locomotive engineer to play a whistle like a musical instrument, using the valve to vary the flow of steam. The term for this was “quilling.” An experiment with a short plain whistle reported in 1883 showed that incrementally increasing steam pressure drove the whistle from E to D-flat, a 68 percent increase in frequency. Pitch deviations from the whistle natural frequency likely follow velocity differences in the steam jet downstream from the aperture, creating phase differences between driving frequency and natural frequency of the whistle. Although at normal blowing pressures the aperture constrains the jet to the speed of sound, once it exits the aperture and expands, velocity decay is a function of absolute pressure. Whistle frequency rising with increased blowing pressure appears to scale with the square root of absolute pressure, likely tracking changing velocity. Also, frequency may vary at a fixed blowing pressure with differences in temperature of steam or compressed air. Industrial steam whistles typically were operated in the range of 100 to 300 pounds per square inch gauge pressure (psig) (0.7 - 2.1 megapascals, MPa), although some were constructed for use on pressures as high as 600 psig (4.1 MPa). All of these pressures are within the choked flow regime, where mass flow scales with upstream absolute pressure and inversely with the square root of absolute temperature. This means that for dry saturated steam, a halving of absolute pressure results in almost a halving of flow. This has been confirmed by tests of whistle steam consumption at various pressures. Excessive pressure for a given whistle design will drive the whistle into an overblown mode, where the fundamental frequency will be replaced by an odd harmonic, that is a frequency that is an odd number multiple of the fundamental. Usually this is the third harmonic (second overtone frequency), but an example has been noted where a large whistle jumped to the fifteenth harmonic. A long narrow whistle such as that of the Liberty ship John W. Brown sounds a rich spectrum of overtones, but is not overblown. (In overblowing the "amplitude of the pipe fundamental frequency falls to zero.") Increasing whistle length increases the number and amplitude of harmonics, as has been demonstrated in experiments with a variable-pitch whistle. Whistles tested on steam produce both even-numbered and odd-numbered harmonics. The harmonic profile of a whistle might also be influenced by aperture width, mouth cut-up, and lip-aperture offset, as is the case for organ pipes.
- Steam quality – The dryness of steam provided to a whistles is variable and will affect whistle tone frequency. Steam quality determines the velocity of sound, which declines with decreasing dryness due to the inertia of the liquid phase. The speed of sound in steam is predictable if steam dryness is known. Also, the specific volume of steam for a given temperature decreases with decreasing dryness. Two examples of estimates of speed of sound in steam calculated from whistles blown under field conditions are 1,326 and 1,352 feet per second.
- Aspect ratio – The more squat the whistle, the greater is the change in pitch with blowing pressure. This may be caused by differences in the Q factor. The pitch of a very squat whistle may rise several semitones as pressure is raised. Whistle frequency prediction thus requires establishment of a set of frequency/pressure curves unique to whistle scale, and a set of whistles may fail to track a musical chord as blowing pressure changes if each whistle is of a different scale. This is true of many antique whistles divided into a series of compartments of the same diameter but of different lengths. Some whistle designers minimized this problem by building resonant chambers of a similar scale.
- Mouth vertical length (“cut-up”) – Frequency of a plain whistle declines as the whistle bell is raised away from the steam source. If the cut-up of an organ whistle or single bell chime is raised (without raising the whistle ceiling), the effective chamber length is shortened. Shortening the chamber drives frequency up, but raising the cut-up drives frequency down. The resulting frequency (higher, lower, or unchanged) will be determined by whistle scale and by competition between the two drivers. The cut-up prescribed by whistle-maker Robert Swanson for 150 psig steam pressure was 0.35 x bell diameter for a plain whistle, which is about 1.45 x net bell cross-sectional area (subtracting stud area). The Nathan Manufacturing Company used a cut-up of 1.56 x chamber cross-sectional area for their 6-note railway chime whistle.
- Cut-up in relation to mouth arc – A large change in cut-up (e.g., 4x difference) may have little impact on whistle natural frequency if mouth area and total resonator length (distance from languid to pipe ceiling) are held constant. For example, a plain whistle, which has a 360-degree mouth (that extends completely around the whistle circumference), can emit a similar frequency to a partial mouth organ whistle of the same mouth area and same overall resonator length (aperture to ceiling), despite an immensely different cut-up. (Cut-up is the distance between the steam aperture and the upper lip of the mouth.) This suggests that effective cut-up is determined by proximity of the oscillating gas column to the steam jet rather than by the distance between the upper mouth lip and the steam aperture.
- Steam aperture width Jet velocity may rise as a function of aperture width -- quadrupling the width of an organ pipe aperture at a fixed blowing pressure resulted in somewhat less than a doubling of velocity at the flue exit. However, widening the aperture has been found to raise frequency in some whistles and to lower frequency in others, and the slope of the frequency/pressure curve may vary with aperture width. This may reflect a subtle difference in aperture-resonator alignment or offset..
- Gas composition – The frequency of a whistle driven by steam is typically higher than that of a whistle driven by compressed air at the same pressure. This frequency difference is caused by the greater speed of sound in steam, which is less dense than air. The magnitude of the frequency difference can vary because the speed of sound is influenced by air temperature and by steam quality. Also, the more squat the whistle, the more sensitive it is to the difference in gas flow rate between steam and air that occurs at a fixed blowing pressure. Data from 14 whistles (34 resonant chambers) sounded under a variety of field conditions showed a wide range of frequency differences between steam and air (5 - 43 percent higher frequency on steam). Very elongate whistles, which are fairly resistant to gas flow differences, sounded a frequency 18 - 22 percent higher on steam (about three semitones).

=== Sound pressure level ===
Whistle sound level varies with several factors:

- Blowing pressure – Sound level increases as blowing pressure is raised, although there may be an optimum pressure at which sound level peaks.
- Aspect ratio – Sound level increases as whistle length is reduced, increasing frequency. For example, depressing the piston of a variable-pitch steam whistle changed the frequency from 333 Hz to 753 Hz and raised the sound pressure level from 116 dBC to 123 dBC. That five-fold difference in the square of the frequency resulted in a five-fold difference in sound intensity. Sound level also increases as whistle cross-sectional area is increased. Sound intensity was correctly ranked for ten of 12 field-tested single-note whistles ranging in size from one-inch diameter to 12-inches diameter using the expression (cross-sectional area / wavelength)^{2}. These whistles were sounded on compressed air at 125 pounds per square inch gauge pressure (862 Kilopascals) and sound levels were recorded at 100 feet distance. Elongate organ whistles may exhibit disproportionately high sound levels due to their strong higher frequency overtones. At a separate venue a 20-inch diameter Ultrawhistle (ring-shaped whistle) with a very large acoustic radiating area and high frequency operating at 15 pounds per square inch gauge pressure (103.4 kilopascals) produced a sound pressure level of 124 dBC at 100 feet. It is unknown how the sound level of this whistle would compare to that of a conventional whistle of the same frequency and resonant chamber area. By comparison, a Bell-Chrysler air raid siren generates 138 dBC at 100 feet. The sound level of a Levavasseur toroidal whistle is enhanced by about 10 decibels by a secondary cavity parallel to the resonant cavity, the former creating a vortex that augments the oscillations of the jet driving the whistle.
- Steam aperture width – If gas flow is restricted by the area of the steam aperture, widening the aperture will increase the sound level for a fixed blowing pressure. Enlarging the steam aperture can compensate for the loss of sound output if pressure is reduced. It has been known since at least the 1830s that whistles can be modified for low pressure operation and still achieve a high sound level. Data on the compensatory relationship between pressure and aperture size are scant, but tests on compressed air indicate that a halving of absolute pressure requires that the aperture size be at least doubled in width to maintain the original sound level, and aperture width in some antique whistle arrays increases with diameter (aperture area thus increasing with whistle cross-sectional area) for whistles of the same scale. Applying the physics of high pressure jets exiting circular apertures, a doubling of velocity and gas concentration at a fixed point in the whistle mouth would require a quadrupling of either aperture area or absolute pressure. (A quartering of absolute pressure would be compensated by a quadrupling of aperture area—the velocity decay constant increases approximately with the square root of absolute pressure in the normal whistle-blowing pressure range.) In reality, trading pressure loss for greater aperture area may be less efficient as pressure-dependent adjustments occur to virtual origin displacement. Quadrupling the width of an organ pipe aperture at a fixed blowing pressure resulted in somewhat less than a doubling of velocity at the flue exit.
- Steam aperture profile – Gas flow rate (and thus sound level) is set not only by aperture area and blowing pressure, but also by aperture geometry. Friction and turbulence influence the flow rate, and are accounted for by a discharge coefficient. A mean estimate of the discharge coefficient from whistle field tests is 0.72 (range 0.69 - 0.74).
- Mouth vertical length (“cut-up”) – The mouth length (cut-up) that provides the highest sound level at a fixed blowing pressure varies with whistle scale, and some makers of multi-tone whistles therefore cut a mouth height unique to the scale of each resonant chamber, maximizing sound output of the whistle. Ideal cut-up for whistles of a fixed diameter and aperture width (including single-bell chime compartments) at a fixed blowing pressure appears to vary approximately with the square root of effective length. Antique whistle makers commonly used a compromise mouth area of about 1.4x whistle cross-sectional area. If a whistle is driven to its maximum sound level with the mouth area set equal to the whistle cross-sectional area, it may be possible to increase the sound level by further increasing the mouth area. .
- Frequency and distance – Sound pressure level decreases by half (six decibels) with each doubling of distance due to divergence from the source, an inversely proportional relationship. (Distinct from the inverse square law, applicable to sound intensity, rather than pressure.) Sound pressure level also decreases due to atmospheric absorption, which is strongly dependent upon frequency, lower frequencies traveling farthest. For example, a 1000 Hz whistle has an atmospheric attenuation coefficient one half that of a 2000 Hz whistle (calculated for 50 percent relative humidity at 20 degrees Celsius). This means that in addition to divergent sound dampening, there would be a loss of 0.5 decibel per 100 meters from the 1000 Hz whistle and 1.0 decibel per 100 meters for the 2000 Hz whistle. Additional factors affecting sound propagation include barriers, atmospheric temperature gradients, and "ground effects.”

=== Terminology ===
Acoustic length or effective length is the quarter wavelength generated by the whistle. It is calculated as one quarter the ratio of speed of sound to the whistle's frequency. Acoustic length may differ from the whistle's physical length, also termed geometric length. depending upon mouth configuration, etc. The end correction is the difference between the acoustic length and the physical length above the mouth. The end correction is a function of diameter whereas the ratio of acoustic length to physical length is a function of scale. These calculations are useful in whistle design to obtain a desired sounding frequency. Working length in early usage meant whistle acoustic length, i.e., the effective length of the working whistle, but recently has been used for physical length including the mouth.

== Loudest and largest whistles ==
Loudness is a subjective perception that is influenced by sound pressure level, sound duration, and sound frequency. High sound pressure level potential has been claimed for the whistles of Vladimir Gavreau, who tested whistles as large as 1.5 meter (59-inch) diameter (37 Hz).

A 20-inch diameter ring-shaped whistle (“Ultrawhistle”) patented and produced by Richard Weisenberger sounded 124 decibels at 100 feet. The variable pitch steam whistle at the New York Wire Company in York, Pennsylvania, was entered in the Guinness Book of World Records in 2002 as the loudest steam whistle on record at 124.1dBA from a set distance used by Guinness. The York whistle was also measured at 134.1 decibels from a distance of 23-feet.

A fire-warning whistle supplied to a Canadian saw mill by the Eaton, Cole, and Burnham Company in 1882 measured 20 inches in diameter, four feet nine inches from bowl to ornament, and weighed 400 pounds. The spindle supporting the whistle bell measured 3.5 inches diameter and the whistle was supplied by a four-inch feed pipe.

Other records of large whistles include an 1893 account of U.S. President Grover Cleveland activating the “largest steam whistle in the world,” said to be “five feet” at the Chicago World's Fair.

The sounding chamber of a whistle installed at the 1924 Long-Bell Lumber Company, Longview, Washington measured 16 inches diameter x 49 inches in length.

The whistle bells of multi-bell chimes used on ocean liners such as the RMS Titanic measured 9, 12, and 15 inches diameter.

The whistle bells of the Canadian Pacific steamships Assiniboia and Keewatin measured 12 inches in diameter and that of the Keewatin measured 60 inches in length.

A multi-bell chime whistle installed at the Standard Sanitary Manufacturing Company in 1926 was composed of five separate whistle bells measuring 5 x15, 7 x 21, 8x 24, 10 x 30, and 12 x36 inches, all plumbed to a five-inch steam pipe.

The Union Water Meter Company of Worcester Massachusetts produced a gong whistle composed of three bells, 8 x 9-3/4, 12 x 15, and 12 x 25 inches. Twelve-inch diameter steam whistles were commonly used at light houses in the 19th century.

It has been claimed that the sound level of an Ultrawhistle would be significantly greater than that of a conventional whistle, but comparative tests of large whistles have not been undertaken. Tests of small Ultrawhistles have not shown higher sound levels compared to conventional whistles of the same diameter.

== See also ==
- Train horn
- Train whistle
