= Organic Rankine cycle =

Variation on the Rankine thermodynamic cycle

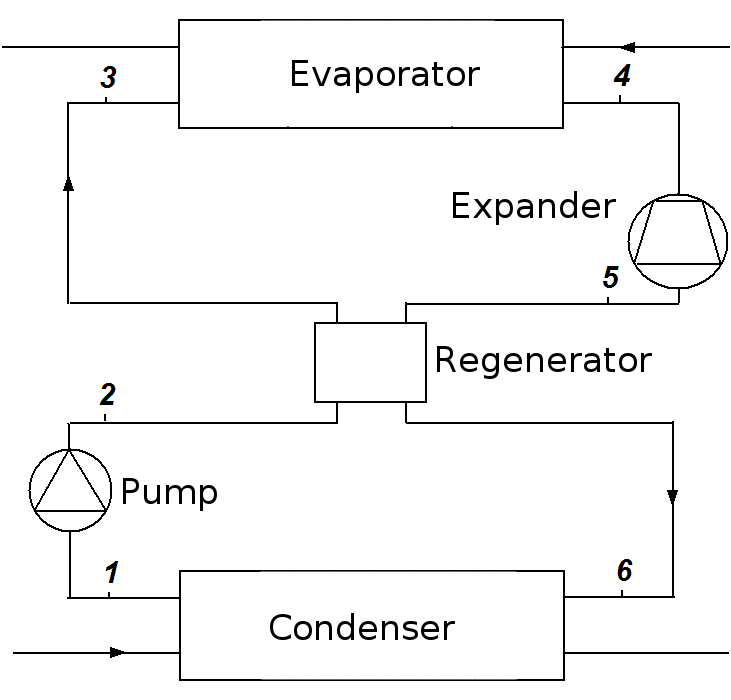
ORC with regenerator

In thermal engineering, the Organic Rankine cycle (ORC) is a type of thermodynamic cycle. It is a variation of the Rankine cycle named for its use of an organic, high-molecular-mass fluid (compared to water) whose vaporization temperature is lower than that of water. The fluid allows heat recovery from lower-temperature sources such as biomass combustion, industrial waste heat, geothermal heat, solar ponds etc. The low-temperature heat is converted into useful work, that can itself be converted into electricity.

The technology was developed in the late 1950s by Lucien Bronicki and Harry Zvi Tabor.

Naphtha engines, similar in principle to ORC but developed for other applications, were in use as early as the 1890s.

== Working principle of the ORC ==
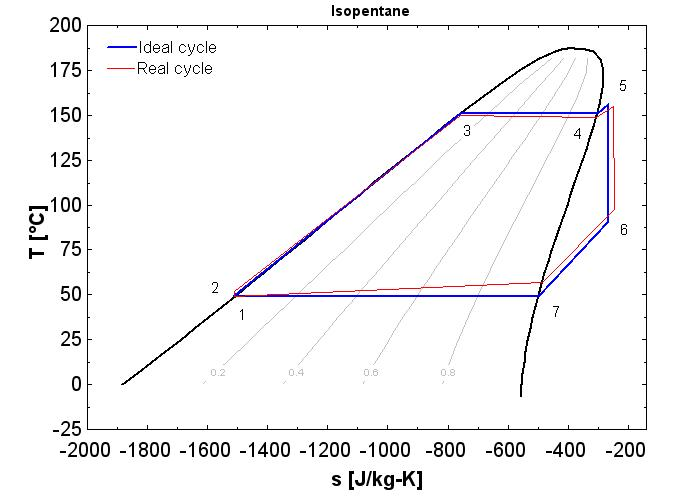
T-s diagram for the ideal/real ORC

The working principle of the organic Rankine cycle is the same as that of the Rankine cycle: the working fluid is pumped to a boiler where it is evaporated, passed through an expansion device (turbine, screw, scroll, or other expander), and then through a condenser heat exchanger where it is finally re-condensed.

In the ideal cycle described by the engine's theoretical model, the expansion is isentropic and the evaporation and condensation processes are isobaric.

In any real cycle, the presence of irreversibilities lowers the cycle efficiency. Those irreversibilities mainly occur:

- During the expansion: Only a part of the energy recoverable from the pressure difference is transformed into useful work. The other part is converted into heat and is lost. The efficiency of the expander is defined by comparison with an isentropic expansion.
- In the heat exchangers: The working fluid takes a long and sinuous path which ensures good heat exchange but causes pressure drops that lower the amount of power recoverable from the cycle. Likewise, the temperature difference between the heat source/sink and the working fluid generates exergy destruction and reduces the cycle performance.

== Applications for the ORC ==
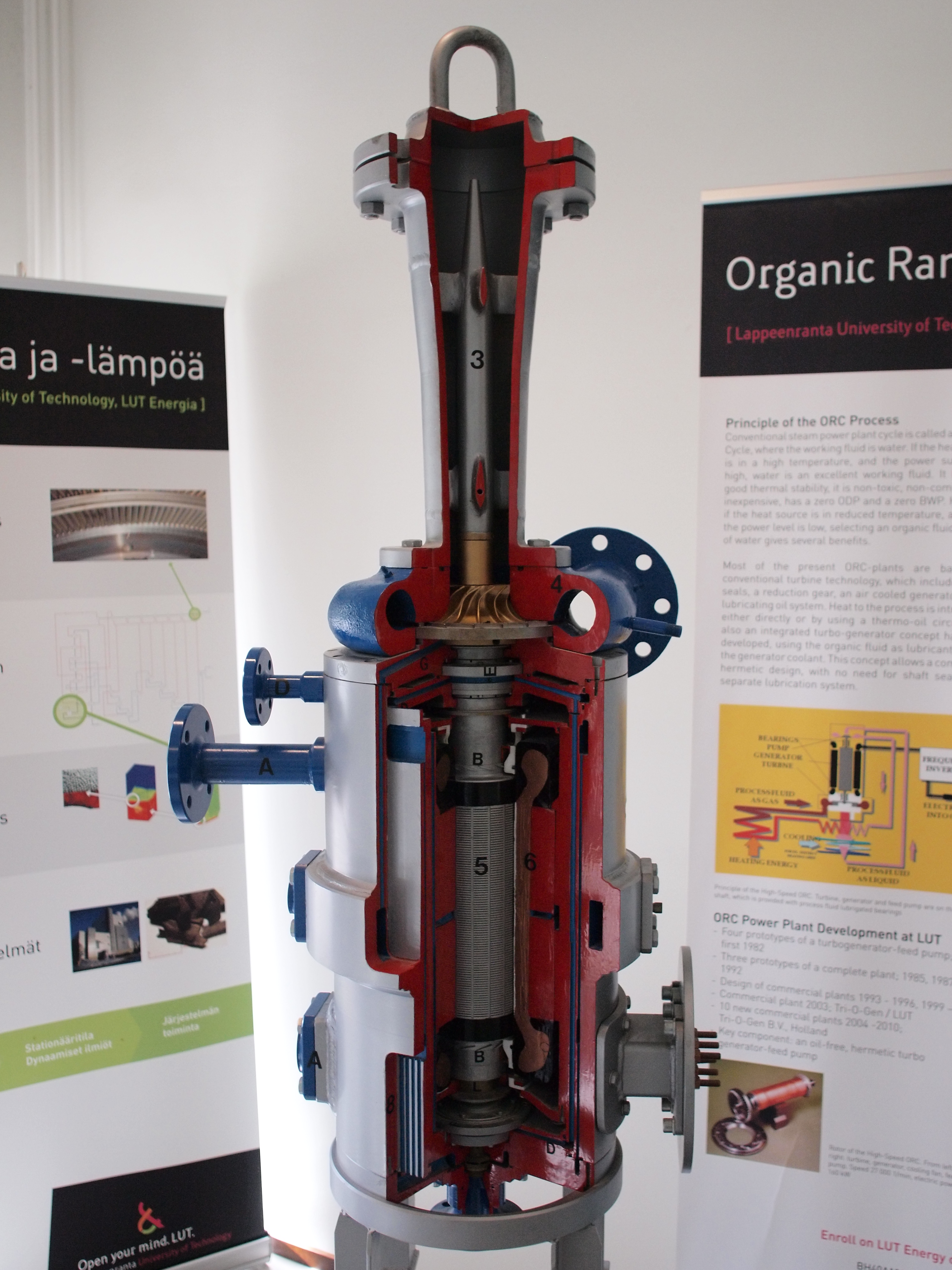
75 kW ORC turbogenerator used at an experimental power plant at the LUT University in Lappeenranta

The organic Rankine cycle technology has many possible applications, and counts more than 2.7 GW of installed capacity and 698 identified power plants worldwide. Among them, the most widespread and promising fields are the following:

=== Waste heat recovery ===
Waste heat recovery is one of the most important development fields for the organic Rankine cycle (ORC). It can be applied to heat and power plants (for example a small scale cogeneration plant on a domestic water heater), or to industrial and farming processes such as organic products fermentation, hot exhausts from ovens or furnaces (e.g. lime and cement kilns), flue-gas condensation, exhaust gases from vehicles, intercooling of a compressor, condenser of a power cycle, etc.

=== Biomass power plant ===
Biomass is available all over the world and can be used for the production of electricity on small to medium size scaled power plants. The problem of high specific investment costs for machinery, such as steam boilers, are overcome due to the low working pressures in ORC power plants. Another advantage is the long operational life of the machine due to the characteristics of the working fluid, that unlike steam is non eroding and non corroding for valve seats tubing and turbine blades. The ORC process also helps to overcome the relatively small amount of input fuel available in many regions because an efficient ORC power plant is possible for smaller sized plants.

=== Geothermal plants ===
Geothermic heat sources vary in temperature from 50 to 350 °C. The ORC is therefore perfectly adapted for this kind of application. However, it is important to keep in mind that for low-temperature geothermal sources (typically less than 100 °C), the efficiency is very low and depends strongly on heat sink temperature (defined by the ambient temperature).

=== Solar thermal power ===
The organic Rankine cycle can be used in the solar parabolic trough technology in place of the usual steam Rankine cycle. The ORC allows electricity generation at lower capacities and lower collector temperature, and hence the possibility for low-cost, small scale decentralized CSP units. The ORC also enables hybrid CSP-PV systems equipped with thermal energy storage to provide on-demand recovery of up to 70% of their instantaneous electricity generation, and can be a fairly efficient alternative to other types of electrical storage.

=== Windthermal energy ===
Recently so called windthermal energy turbines are discussed that could convert wind energy directly into medium temperature heat (up to 600°C). They can be combined with a thermal storage and could suitably be matched with ORC to generate electricity.

However, due to the Carnot efficiency of the turbine, it may be more efficient to use the thermal energy as heat itself rather than to generate electricity.

== Choice of the working fluid ==
The selection of the working fluid is of key importance in low temperature Rankine cycles. Because of the low temperature, heat transfer inefficiencies are highly prejudicial. These inefficiencies depend very strongly on the thermodynamic characteristics of the fluid and on the operating conditions.

In order to recover low-grade heat, the fluid generally has a lower boiling temperature than water. Refrigerants and hydrocarbons are two commonly used components.

Optimal characteristics of the working fluid:

- Isentropic saturation vapor curve:

Since the purpose of the ORC focuses on the recovery of low grade heat power, a superheated approach like the traditional Rankine cycle is not appropriate. Therefore, a small superheating at the exhaust of the evaporator will always be preferred, which disadvantages "wet" fluids (that are in two-phase state at the end of the expansion). In the case of dry fluids, a regenerator should be used.

- Low freezing point, high stability temperature:

Unlike water, organic fluids usually suffer chemical deteriorations and decomposition at high temperatures. The maximum hot source temperature is thus limited by the chemical stability of the working fluid. The freezing point should be lower than the lowest temperature in the cycle.

- High heat of vaporisation and density:

A fluid with a high latent heat and density will absorb more energy from the source in the evaporator and thus reduce the required flow rate, the size of the facility, and the pump consumption.

- Low environmental impact

The main parameters taken into account are the Ozone depletion potential (ODP) and the global warming potential (GWP).

- Safety

The fluid should be non-corrosive, non-flammable, and non-toxic. The ASHRAE safety classification of refrigerants can be used as an indicator of the fluid dangerousness level.

- Good availability and low cost
- Acceptable pressures

=== Examples of working fluids ===
- CFCs: Banned by Montreal Protocol due to ozone depletion (e.g. R-11, R-12)
- HCFCs: Phasing out due to Copenhagen Amendment to Montreal Protocol (e.g. R-22, R-123)
- HFCs (e.g. R134a, R245fa)
- HCs: Flammable, common by-products of gas processing facilities (e.g. isobutane, pentane, propane)
- PFCs

== Modeling ORC systems ==
Simulating ORC cycles requires a numerical solver in which the equations of mass and energy balance, heat transfer, pressure drops, mechanical losses, leakages, etc. are implemented.

ORC models can be subdivided into two main types: steady-state and dynamic. Steady-state models are required both for design (or sizing) purpose, and for part-load simulation.

Dynamic models, on the other hand, also account for energy and mass accumulation in the different components. They are particularly useful to implement and simulate control strategies, e.g. during transients or during start & stop.

Another key aspect of ORC modeling is the computation of the organic fluid thermodynamic properties. Simple equation of states (EOS) such as Peng–Robinson should be avoided since their accuracy is low. Multiparameter EOS should be preferred, using e.g. state-of-the-art thermophysical and transport properties databases.

Various tools are available for the above purposes, each presenting advantages and drawbacks. The most common ones are reported here.

Tool	Causality	Simulation type	Distribution	Examples	Description
General thermodynamic modeling tools
AxCYCLE	Acausal	steady-state	Non-free		
Cycle-Tempo	Causal	steady-state	Non-free		
Engineering Equation Solver	Acausal	steady-state	Non-free	Simple ORC Model in EES	
GT-SUITE	Acausal	steady-state & dynamic	Non-free		
LMS Imagine.Lab Amesim	Causal and Acausal	steady-state & dynamic	Non-free	Small Scale ORC Plant	
ProSimPlus	/	steady-state	Non-free		
General modeling tools
MATLAB / Simulink	Causal	steady-state / dynamic	Non-free		
Scilab / Xcos	Acausal	steady-state / dynamic	Open-source		Open-source alternative to Matlab.
General tools for thermophysical and transport properties of organic fluids
AspenProp	/		Non-free		
CoolProp	/		Open-source		
FluidProp	/		Free		
Refprop	/		Non-free		
Simulis Thermodynamics	/		Non-free		

== See also ==
- Rankine cycle
- Thermodynamic cycle
- Relative cost of electricity generated by different sources
- Naphtha launch
- Working fluids
- Non ideal compressible fluid dynamics
