= Saturation vapor curve =

Curve separating the two-phase and superheated states of a T-s diagram

In thermodynamics, the saturation vapor curve is the curve separating the two-phase state and the superheated vapor state in the T–s diagram (temperature–entropy diagram).

The saturated liquid curve is the curve separating the subcooled liquid state and the two-phase state in the T–s diagram.

When used in a power cycle, the fluid expansion depends strongly on the nature of this saturation curve:

- A "wet" fluid shows a negative saturation vapor curve. If overheating before the expansion is limited, a two-phase state is obtained at the end of the expansion.

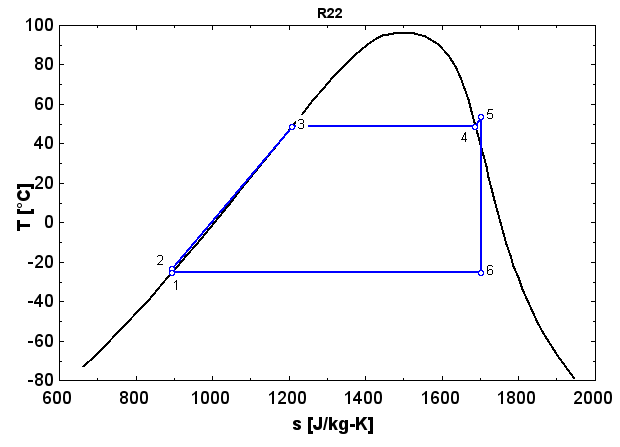

- An "isentropic" fluid shows a vertical saturation vapor curve. It remains very close to the saturated vapor state after an hypothetical isentropic expansion.

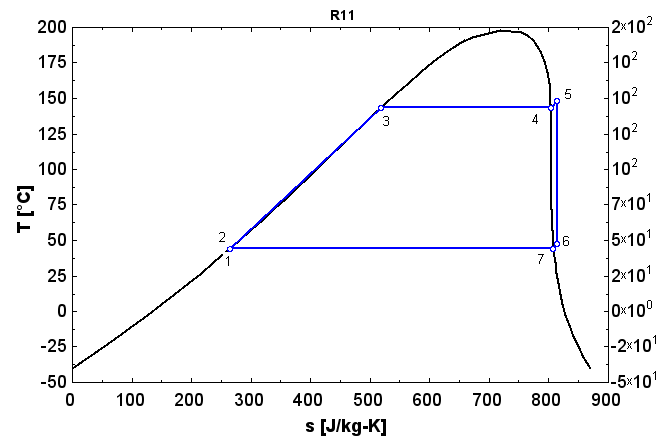

- A "dry" fluid shows a positive saturation vapor curve. It is in dry vapor state at the end of the expansion, and strongly overheated.

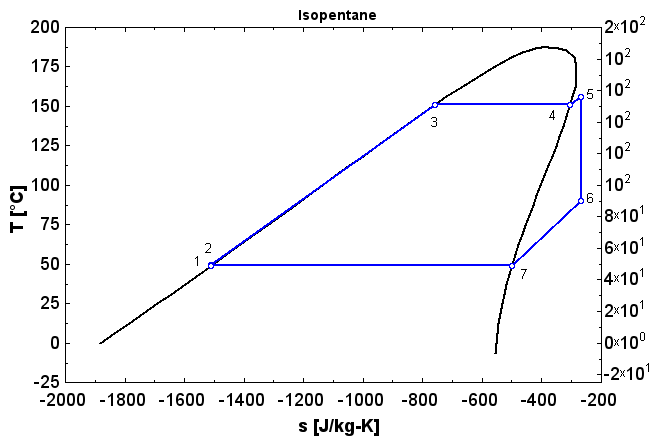

== See also ==
- Phase diagram
- Working fluid
- Working fluid selection
