= Temperature–entropy diagram =

Graph relating temperature and entropy during a thermodynamic process or cycle

In thermodynamics, a temperature–entropy (T–s) diagram is a thermodynamic diagram used to visualize changes to temperature (T ) and specific entropy (s) during a thermodynamic process or cycle as the graph of a curve. It is a useful and common tool, particularly because it helps to visualize the heat transfer during a process. For reversible (ideal) processes, the area under the T–s curve of a process is the heat transferred to the system during that process.

Working fluids are often categorized on the basis of the shape of their T–s diagram.

An isentropic process is depicted as a vertical line on a T–s diagram, whereas an isothermal process is a horizontal line.

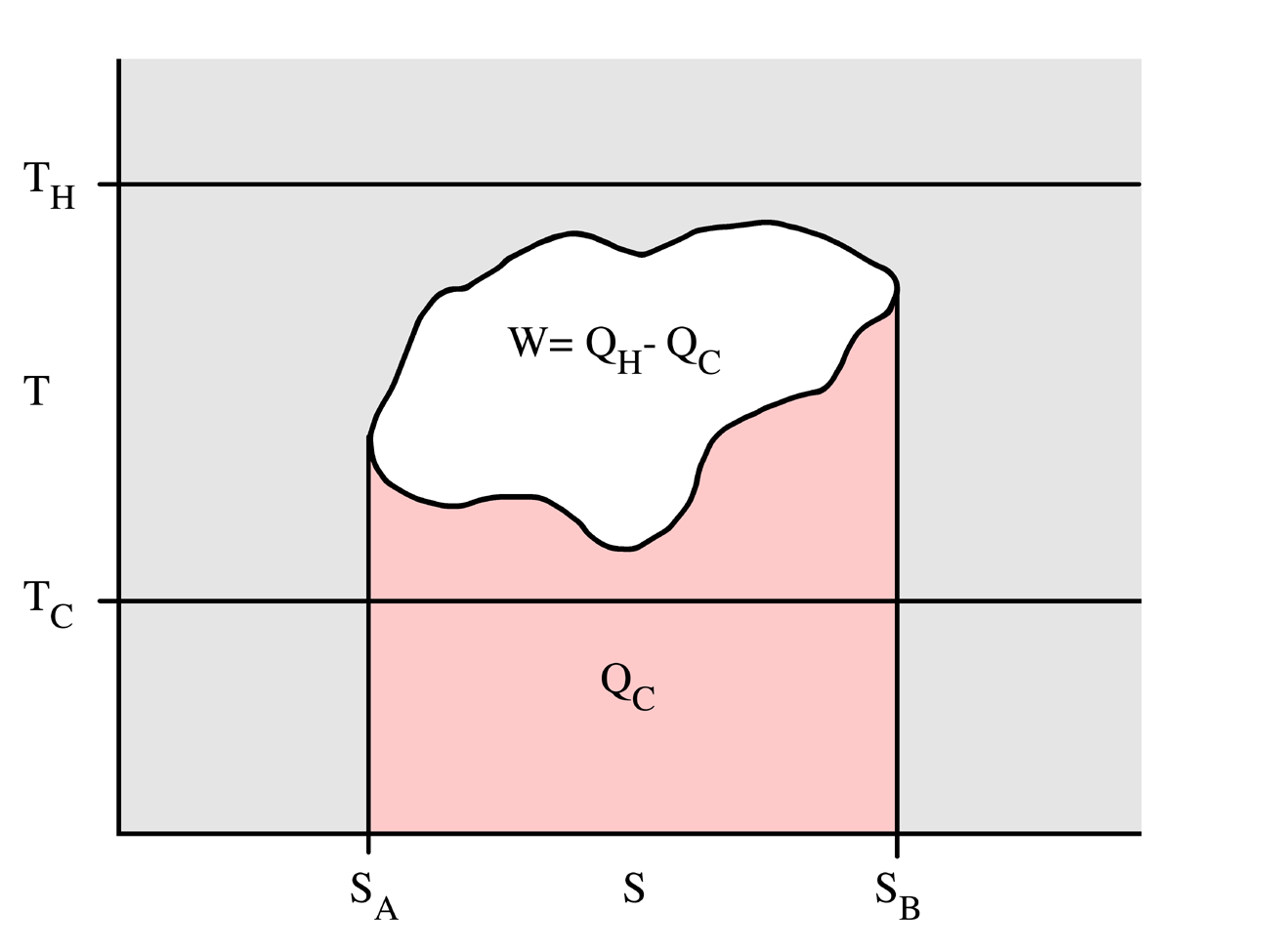
Example T–s diagram for a thermodynamic cycle taking place between a hot reservoir (T_{H}) and a cold reservoir (T_{C}). For reversible processes, such as those found in the Carnot cycle: Q_{C} = the amount of energy exchanged between the system and the cold reservoir W = work exchanged by the system with its surroundings Q_{H} = W + Q_{C} = heat exchanged with the hot reservoir. η = W / Q_{H} = thermal efficiency of the cycle If the cycle moves in a clockwise sense, then it is a heat engine that outputs work; if the cycle moves in a counterclockwise sense, it is a heat pump that takes in work and moves heat Q_{H} from the cold reservoir to the hot reservoir.

T–s diagram for steam, US units

== See also ==
- Carnot cycle
- Pressure–volume diagram
- Rankine cycle
- Saturation vapor curve
- Working fluid
- Working fluid selection
