= Water power engine =

Umbrella term for engines that use water

A water power engine includes prime movers driven by water and which may be classified under three categories:

1. Water pressure motors, having a piston and cylinder with inlet and outlet valves: their action is that analogous of a steam- or gas-engine with water as the working fluid - see water engine
2. Water wheels
3. Turbines, deriving their energy from high velocity jet of jets (the impulse machine), or from water supplied under pressure and passing through the vanes of a runner which is thereby caused to rotate (the reaction type)

Hydro power is generated when the natural force from the water's current moves a device (fan, propeller, wheel) that is pushed by the force of the water. Ordinary water weighs 8.36 lbs per gallon (1 kg per liter). The force makes the turbine mechanism spin, creating electricity. As long as there is flow, it is possible to produce electricity. The advantage of electricity generated in this way is that it is a renewable resource. A small-scale Micro Hydro Power can be a long lasting piece of technology. The problem of the system is that technology has yet to be developed more than what it is today.

== See also ==
- Water engine
- Water-returning engine
- Water turbine
  - Working fluid
  - Rankine cycle
- Hydroelectricity
