= Harry Zvi Tabor =

Israeli solar energy physicist (1917–2015)

- הרי צבי תבור
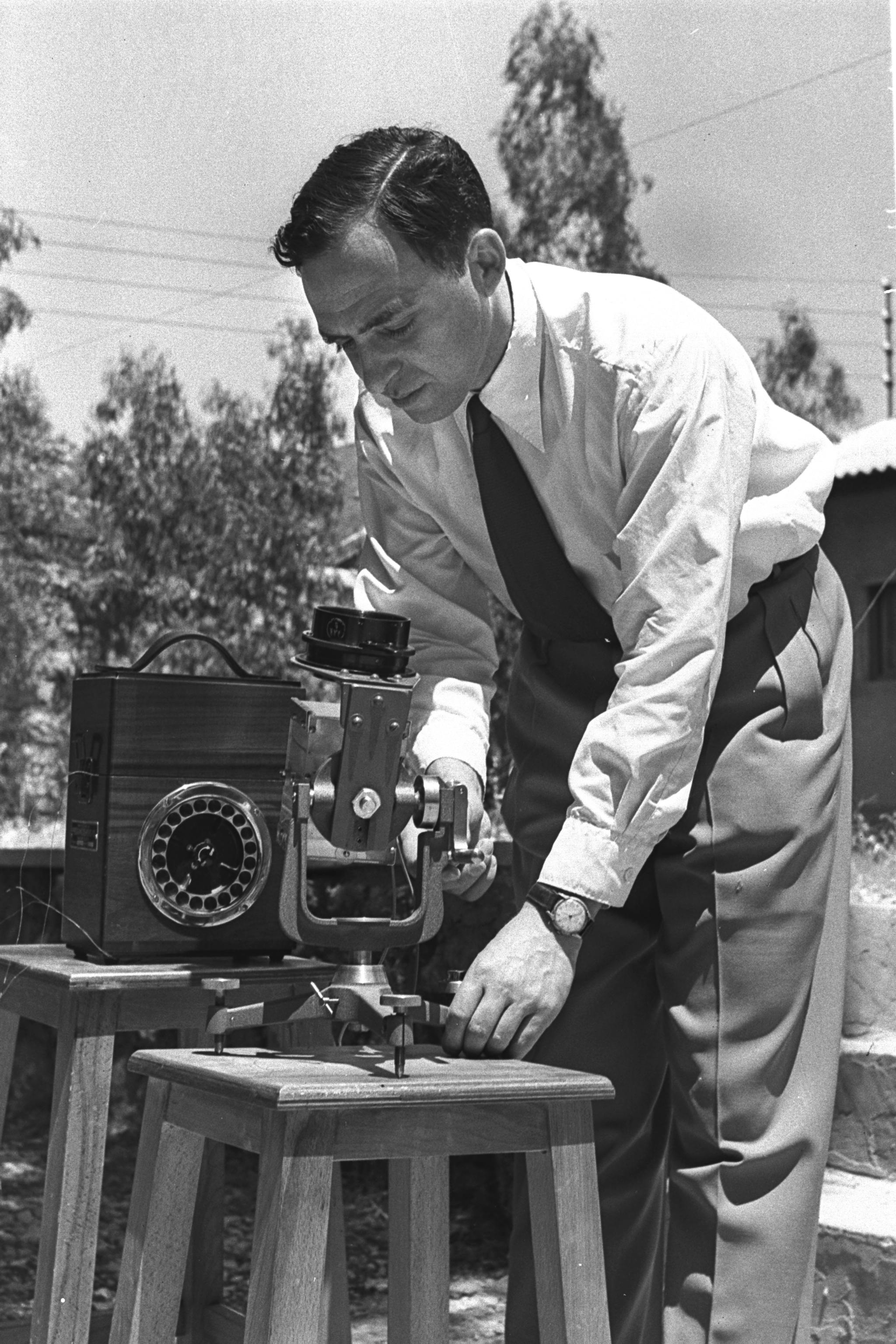
- Harry Zvi Tabor with his invention of solar energy trap that absorbs sun rays and converts them into heat, 1955
- Born: March 7, 1917; London, England
- Died: December 15, 2015 (aged 98); Jerusalem, Israel
- Resting place: Har HaMenuchot, Jerusalem
- Education: University of London; Hebrew University of Jerusalem
- Known for: Solar water heater "Black chrome" solar absorber coating
- Parent(s): Charles and Rebecca Tabor
- Awards: Royal Society Energy Award (1975); Solar Hall of Fame (1979); Honorary doctorate, Weizmann Institute of Science (1992); International Solar Energy Society Award (1981); Krupp Foundation Energy Award (1981); Passive Low Energy Architecture International Award (1994); Knesset Quality of Life Award (1995); Presidential Medal of Distinction (2014)
- Scientific career
- Fields: Physics, solar energy
- Workplaces: National Physical Laboratory of Israel

Harry Zvi Tabor (Hebrew: הרי צבי תבור; March 7, 1917 – December 15, 2015) was an Israeli physicist. He is known as the father of Israeli solar energy. He is generally credited with having brought Israel's solar energy program to international prominence.

== Biography ==
Harry Zvi Tabor was born at London in 1917 to Charles and Rebecca Tabor. As a youth, he was involved in the UK branch of Habonim Dror, and participated in an 80th anniversary reunion in 2009. In 1947 he married Vivenne Landau. He received his bachelor's degree in applied physics from the University of London, and his doctorate in renewable energy at the Hebrew University. He died in Jerusalem on December 15, 2015, at the age of 98.

== Scientific career ==
In 1949 prime minister David Ben-Gurion sent a letter to England to offer Tabor a job on the 'physics and engineering desk' of the Research Council of Israel, which he accepted. His first task was to create the National Physical Laboratory of Israel, which had been Tabor's idea as he felt it was essential the new country have the equivalent of the National Physical Laboratory in Britain to create standards amongst the different measurements in use in the country, primarily British, Ottoman and metric. Once the laboratory was established, he focused on solar energy for research and development.

He was instrumental in developing the solar water heater that 95 percent of Israeli households have. In 1992 he was awarded an honorary degree from the Weizmann Institute of Science. These simple water heaters operated without pumps, whereby cold water was heated in the panel, which acted as a thermosiphon. This unit in turn became the standard for solar water heating worldwide, and helped popularize the commercialization of solar thermal technology in the United States in the 1970s, where Tabor lectured and acted as a consultant to solar start-up companies such as Northrup, Inc. which subsequently merged into ARCO Solar, which became BP Solar. Tabor experimented with various coatings to optimize the absorptivity of solar energy, with minimizing the re-radiation, or emissivity of the heat absorbed. He developped a selective coating of electrodeposited black nickel, called the "Tabor selective surface".

Tabor worked with the Standards Institute of Israel, to establish testing procedures and an official performance certificates so that a solar collector could not be bought without SII certification.

Tabor and French immigrant Lucien Bronicki developed a small solar power unit, an Organic Rankine cycle turbine, for developing countries with problematic power grids. It was designed to neutralize the maintenance issues of reciprocating engines so it had only one moving part, the rotor. A 3 kWe prototype was exhibited at the 1961 United Nations Conference on New Sources of Energy in Rome, but it failed to find commercial success.

== Awards and recognition ==
- 1956 – Weizmann Prize
- 1975 – Royal Society Energy Award
- 1979 – Inducted in Solar Hall of Fame
- 1981 – International Solar Energy Society Farrington Daniels Award
- 1981 – Krupp Foundation Energy Award
- 1994 – Passive Low Energy Architecture (PLEA) Award
- 1995 – Israeli Knesset Quality of Life Award
- 2014 – Israeli President's Medal of Distinction

== See also ==
- David Faiman

Original materials are archived at the Weizmann Institute of Science, Rehovot, Israel.
