= Specific volume =

Volume occupied per unit mass

In thermodynamics, the specific volume of a substance (symbol: ν, nu) is the quotient of the substance's volume (V) to its mass (m):

$$\nu = \frac{V}{m}$$

It is a mass-specific intrinsic property of the substance. It is the reciprocal of density ρ (rho) and it is also related to the molar volume and molar mass:

$$\nu = \rho^{-1} = \frac{\tilde V}{M}$$

The standard unit of specific volume is cubic meters per kilogram (m^{3}/kg), but other units include ft^{3}/lb, ft^{3}/slug, or mL/g.

Specific volume for an ideal gas is related to the molar gas constant (R) and the gas's temperature (T), pressure (P), and molar mass (M) as shown:

Since $PV = {nRT}$ and $n = \frac{m}{M}$

$$\nu = \frac{V}{m} = \frac{RT}{PM}$$

== Applications ==
Specific volume is commonly applied to:

- Molar volume
- Volume (thermodynamics)
- Partial molar volume

Imagine a variable-volume, airtight chamber containing a certain number of atoms of oxygen gas. Consider the following four examples:

- If the chamber is made smaller without allowing gas in or out, the density increases and the specific volume decreases.
- If the chamber expands without letting gas in or out, the density decreases and the specific volume increases.
- If the size of the chamber remains constant and new atoms of gas are injected, the density increases and the specific volume decreases.
- If the size of the chamber remains constant and some atoms are removed, the density decreases and the specific volume increases.

Specific volume is a property of materials, defined as the number of cubic meters occupied by one kilogram of a particular substance. The standard unit is the meter cubed per kilogram (m^{3}/kg or m^{3}·kg^{−1}).

Sometimes specific volume is expressed in terms of the number of cubic centimeters occupied by one gram of a substance. In this case, the unit is the centimeter cubed per gram (cm^{3}/g or cm^{3}·g^{−1}). To convert m^{3}/kg to cm^{3}/g, multiply by 1000; conversely, multiply by 0.001.

Specific volume is inversely proportional to density. If the density of a substance doubles, its specific volume, as expressed in the same base units, is cut in half. If the density drops to 1/10 its former value, the specific volume, as expressed in the same base units, increases by a factor of 10.

The density of gases changes with even slight variations in temperature, while densities of liquid and solids, which are generally thought of as incompressible, will change very little. Specific volume is the inverse of the density of a substance; therefore, careful consideration must be taken account when dealing with situations that involve gases. Small changes in temperature will have a noticeable effect on specific volumes.

The average density of human blood is 1060 kg/m^{3}. The specific volume that correlates to that density is 0.00094 m^{3}/kg. Notice that the average specific volume of blood is almost identical to that of water: 0.00100 m^{3}/kg.

=== Examples ===
If one sets out to determine the specific volume of an ideal gas, such as super heated steam, using the equation ν = RT/P, where pressure is 2500 lbf/in^{2}, R is 0.596, temperature is 1960 °R. In that case, the specific volume would equal 0.4672 in^{3}/lb. However, if the temperature is changed to 1160 °R, the specific volume of the super heated steam would have changed to 0.2765 in^{3}/lb, which is a 59% overall change.

Knowing the specific volumes of two or more substances allows one to find useful information for certain applications. For a substance X with a specific volume of 0.657 cm^{3}/g and a substance Y with a specific volume 0.374 cm^{3}/g, the density of each substance can be found by taking the inverse of the specific volume; therefore, substance X has a density of 1.522 g/cm^{3} and substance Y has a density of 2.673 g/cm^{3}. With this information, the specific gravities of each substance relative to one another can be found. The specific gravity of substance X with respect to Y is 0.569, while the specific gravity of Y with respect to X is 1.756. Therefore, substance X will not sink if placed on Y.

== Specific volume of solutions ==
The specific volume of a non-ideal solution is the sum of the partial specific volumes of the components:

$$\nu =\frac {1}{\rho} = \frac{\tilde V}{M} = \sum_i w_i\cdot \bar{\nu_i}$$

M is the molar mass of the mixture. This can be used instead of volume, as this is intensive property tied to the system.

== Common values ==
The table below displays densities and specific volumes for various common substances that may be useful. The values were recorded at standard temperature and pressure, which is defined as air at 0 °C (273.15 K, 32 °F) and 1 atm (101.325 kN/m^{2}, 101.325 kPa, 14.7 psia, 0 psig, 30 in Hg, 760 torr).

Substance name	Density	Specific volume
Substance name	(kg/m^{3})	(m^{3}/kg)
Air	1.225	0.816
Ice	916.7	0.00109
Water (liquid)	1000	0.00100
Salt Water	1030	0.00097
Mercury	13546	0.00007
R-22*	3.66	0.273
Ammonia	0.769	1.30
Carbon dioxide	1.977	0.506
Chlorine	2.994	0.334
Hydrogen	0.0899	11.12
Methane	0.717	1.39
Nitrogen	1.25	0.799
Steam*	0.804	1.24

* values not taken at standard temperature and pressure
