= Working fluid =

Pressurized gas or liquid in a heat engine

For fluid power, a working fluid is a gas or liquid that primarily transfers force, motion, or mechanical energy. In hydraulics, water or hydraulic fluid transfers force between hydraulic components such as hydraulic pumps, hydraulic cylinders, and hydraulic motors that are assembled into hydraulic machinery, hydraulic drive systems, etc. In pneumatics, the working fluid is air or another gas which transfers force between pneumatic components such as compressors, vacuum pumps, pneumatic cylinders, and pneumatic motors. In pneumatic systems, the working gas also stores energy because it is compressible. (Gases also heat up as they are compressed and cool as they expand. Some gases also condense into liquids as they are compressed and boil as pressure is reduced.)

For passive heat transfer, a working fluid is a gas or liquid, usually called a coolant or heat transfer fluid, that primarily transfers heat into or out of a region of interest by conduction, convection, and/or forced convection (pumped liquid cooling, air cooling, etc.).

The working fluid of a heat engine or heat pump is a gas or liquid, usually called a refrigerant, coolant, or working gas, that primarily converts thermal energy (temperature change) into mechanical energy (or vice versa) by phase change and/or heat of compression and expansion. Examples using phase change include water↔steam in steam engines, and refrigerants in vapor-compression refrigeration and air conditioning systems. Examples without phase change include air or hydrogen in hot air engines such as the Stirling engine, air or gases in gas-cycle heat pumps, etc. (Some heat pumps and heat engines use "working solids", such as rubber bands, for elastocaloric refrigeration or thermoelastic cooling and nickel titanium in a prototype heat engine.)

Working fluids other than air or water are necessarily recirculated in a loop. Some hydraulic and passive heat-transfer systems are open to the water supply and/or atmosphere, sometimes through breather filters. Heat engines, heat pumps, and systems using volatile liquids or special gases are usually sealed behind relief valves.

== Properties and states ==
The working fluid's properties are essential for the full description of thermodynamic systems. Although working fluids have many physical properties which can be defined, the thermodynamic properties which are often required in engineering design and analysis are few. Pressure, temperature, enthalpy, entropy, specific volume, and internal energy are the most common.

Pressure–volume diagram showing state (p, V)

If at least two thermodynamic properties are known, the state of the working fluid can be defined. This is usually done on a property diagram which is simply a plot of one property versus another.

Typical thermodynamic process for a working fluid (expansion from state 1 to state 2)

When the working fluid passes through engineering components such as turbines and compressors, the point on a property diagram moves due to the possible changes of certain properties. In theory therefore it is possible to draw a line/curve which fully describes the thermodynamic properties of the fluid. In reality however this can only be done if the process is reversible. If not, the changes in property are represented as a dotted line on a property diagram. This issue does not really affect thermodynamic analysis since in most cases it is the end states of a process which are sought after.

== Work ==
The working fluid can be used to output useful work if used in a turbine. Also, in thermodynamic cycles energy may be input to the working fluid by means of a compressor. The mathematical formulation for this may be quite simple if we consider a cylinder in which a working fluid resides. A piston is used to input useful work to the fluid. From mechanics, the work done from state 1 to state 2 of the process is given by:

$$W = -\int_{1}^{2} \mathbf{F} \cdot \mathrm{d}\mathbf{s}$$

where ds is the incremental distance from one state to the next and F is the force applied. The negative sign is introduced since in this case a decrease in volume is being considered. The situation is shown in the following figure:

Work input on a working fluid by means of a cylinder–piston arrangement

The force is given by the product of the pressure in the cylinder and its cross sectional area such that

$$\begin{align}
W &= -\int_{1}^{2} PA \cdot \mathrm{d}\mathbf{s} \\
&= -\int_{1}^{2} P \cdot \mathrm{d}V
\end{align}$$

Where A⋅ds = dV is the elemental change of cylinder volume. If from state 1 to 2 the volume increases then the working fluid actually does work on its surroundings and this is commonly denoted by a negative work. If the volume decreases the work is positive. By the definition given with the above integral the work done is represented by the area under a pressure–volume diagram. If we consider the case where we have a constant pressure process then the work is simply given by

$$\begin{align}
W &= -P \int_{1}^{2} \mathrm{d}V \\
&= -P \cdot \left(V_2 - V_1\right)
\end{align}$$

Constant pressure process on a p–V diagram

== Selection ==
Depending on the application, various types of working fluids are used. In a thermodynamic cycle it may be the case that the working fluid changes state from gas to liquid or vice versa. Certain gases such as helium can be treated as ideal gases. This is not generally the case for superheated steam and the ideal gas equation does not really hold. At much higher temperatures however it still yields relatively accurate results. The physical and chemical properties of the working fluid are extremely important when designing thermodynamic systems. For instance, in a refrigeration unit, the working fluid is called the refrigerant. Ammonia is a typical refrigerant and may be used as the primary working fluid. Compared with water (which can also be used as a refrigerant), ammonia makes use of relatively high pressures requiring more robust and expensive equipment.

In air standard cycles as in gas turbine cycles, the working fluid is air. In the open cycle gas turbine, air enters a compressor where its pressure is increased. The compressor therefore inputs work to the working fluid (positive work). The fluid is then transferred to a combustion chamber where this time heat energy is input by means of the burning of a fuel. The air then expands in a turbine thus doing work against the surroundings (negative work).

Different working fluids have different properties and in choosing one in particular the designer must identify the major requirements. In refrigeration units, high latent heats are required to provide large refrigeration capacities.

== Applications and examples ==
The following table gives typical applications of working fluids and examples for each:

Application	Typical working fluid	Specific example
Gas turbine cycles	Air	
Rankine cycles	Water↔steam, pentane, toluene	
Vapor-compression refrigeration, heat pumps	Chlorofluorocarbons, hydrochlorofluorocarbons, fluorocarbons, propane, butane, isobutane, ammonia, sulfur dioxide	Commercial refrigerators, Air conditioners
Reusable launch vehicle extensible vertical-landing legs	Helium	SpaceX reusable launch system development program

== See also ==
- List of gases
- Water power engine
