= Electricity generation =

Process of generating electrical power

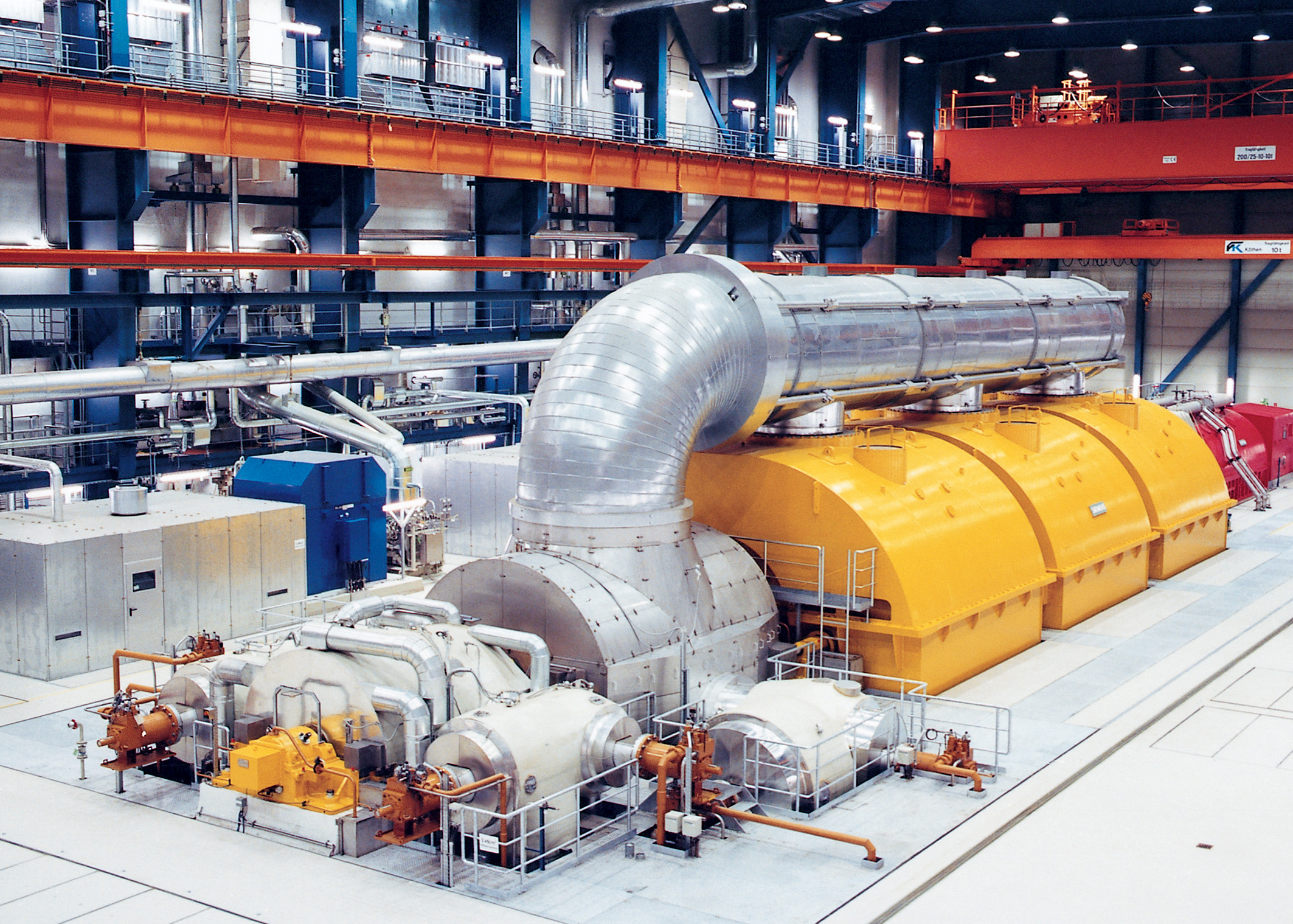
A turbo generator

Electricity generation is the process of generating electric power from sources of primary energy. For utilities in the electric power industry, it is the stage prior to its delivery (transmission, distribution, etc.) to end users or its storage, using for example, the pumped-storage method.

Consumable electricity is not freely available in nature, so it must be "produced", transforming other forms of energy to electricity. Production is carried out in power stations, also called "power plants". Electricity is most often generated at a power plant by electromechanical generators, primarily driven by heat engines fueled by combustion or nuclear fission, but also by other means such as the kinetic energy of flowing water and wind. Other energy sources include solar photovoltaics and geothermal power. There are exotic and speculative methods to recover energy, such as proposed fusion reactor designs which aim to directly extract energy from intense magnetic fields generated by fast-moving charged particles generated by the fusion reaction (see magnetohydrodynamics).

Phasing out coal-fired power stations and eventually gas-fired power stations, or, if practical, capturing their greenhouse gas emissions, is an important part of the energy transformation required to limit climate change. Vastly more solar power and wind power is forecast to be required, with electricity demand increasing strongly with further electrification of transport, homes and industry. However, in 2023, it was reported that the global electricity supply was approaching peak CO_{2} emissions thanks to the growth of solar and wind power.

== History ==
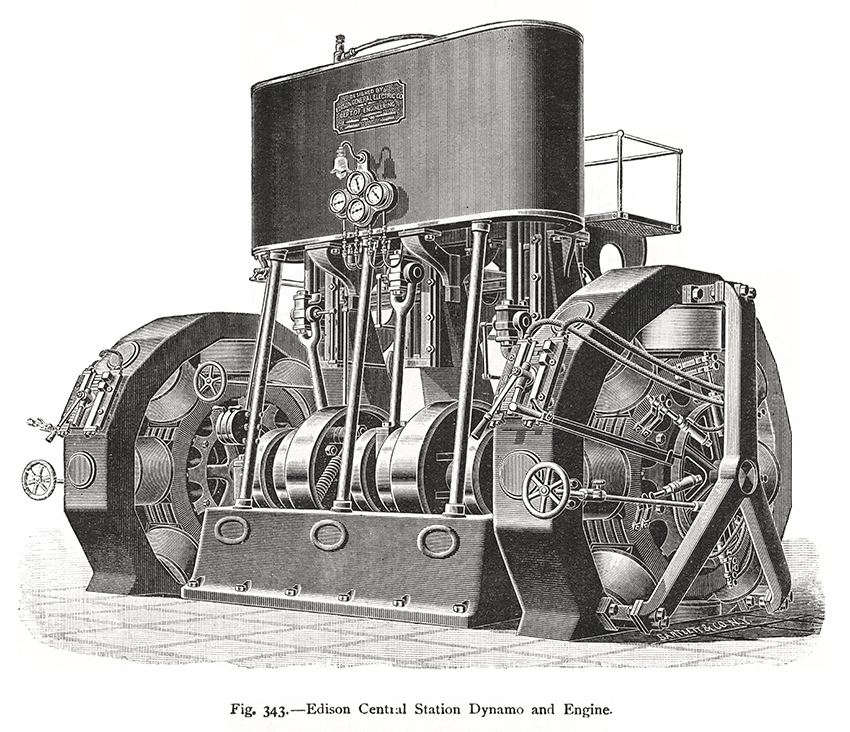
Dynamos and engine installed at Edison General Electric Company, New York, 1895

The fundamental principles of electricity generation were discovered in the 1820s and early 1830s by British scientist Michael Faraday. His method, still used today, is for electricity to be generated by the movement of a loop of wire, or Faraday disc, between the poles of a magnet. Central power stations became economically practical with the development of alternating current (AC) power transmission, using power transformers to transmit power at high voltage and with low loss.

Commercial electricity production started with the coupling of the dynamo to the hydraulic turbine. The mechanical production of electric power began the Second Industrial Revolution and made possible several inventions using electricity, with the major contributors being Thomas Alva Edison and Nikola Tesla. Previously the only way to produce electricity was by chemical reactions or using battery cells, and the only practical use of electricity was for the telegraph.

Electricity generation at central power stations started in 1882, when a steam engine driving a dynamo at Pearl Street Station produced a DC current that powered public lighting on Pearl Street, New York. The new technology was quickly adopted by many cities around the world, which adapted their gas-fueled street lights to electric power. Electric lights were soon used in public buildings, in businesses, and to power public transport, such as trams and trains.

The first power plants used water power or coal. Today a variety of energy sources are used, such as coal, nuclear, natural gas, hydroelectric, wind, and oil, as well as solar energy, tidal power, and geothermal sources.

In the 1880s the popularity of electricity grew massively with the introduction of the Incandescent light bulb. Although there are 22 recognised inventors of the light bulb prior to Joseph Swan and Thomas Edison, Edison and Swan's invention became by far the most successful and popular of all. During the early years of the 19th century, massive jumps in electrical sciences were made. And by the later 19th century the advancement of electrical technology and engineering led to electricity being part of everyday life. With the introduction of many electrical inventions and their implementation into everyday life, the demand for electricity within homes grew dramatically. With this increase in demand, the potential for profit was seen by many entrepreneurs who began investing into electrical systems to eventually create the first electricity public utilities. This process in history is often described as electrification.

The earliest distribution of electricity came from companies operating independently of one another. A consumer would purchase electricity from a producer, and the producer would distribute it through their own power grid. As technology improved so did the productivity and efficiency of its generation. Inventions such as the steam turbine had a massive impact on the efficiency of electrical generation but also the economics of generation as well. This conversion of heat energy into mechanical work was similar to that of steam engines, however at a significantly larger scale and far more productively. The improvements of these large-scale generation plants were critical to the process of centralised generation as they would become vital to the entire power system that we now use today.

Throughout the middle of the 20th century many utilities began merging their distribution networks due to economic and efficiency benefits. Along with the invention of long-distance power transmission, the coordination of power plants began to form. This system was then secured by regional system operators to ensure stability and reliability. The electrification of homes began in Northern Europe and in the Northern America in the 1920s in large cities and urban areas. It was not until the 1930s that rural areas saw the large-scale establishment of electrification.

== Methods of generation ==
2024 world electricity generation by source in terawatt-hours (TWh). Total generation was 30.85 petawatt-hours.
1. Coal 10,587 (34.4%)
2. Natural gas 6,796 (22.1%)
3. Hydro 4,417 (14.4%)
4. Nuclear 2,765 (8.99%)
5. Wind 2,497 (8.12%)
6. Solar 2,130 (6.92%)
7. Other 1,569 (5.10%)

Several fundamental methods exist to convert other forms of energy into electrical energy. Utility-scale generation is achieved by rotating electric generators or by photovoltaic systems. A small proportion of electric power distributed by utilities is provided by batteries. Other forms of electricity generation used in niche applications include the triboelectric effect, the piezoelectric effect, the thermoelectric effect, and betavoltaics.

=== Generators ===
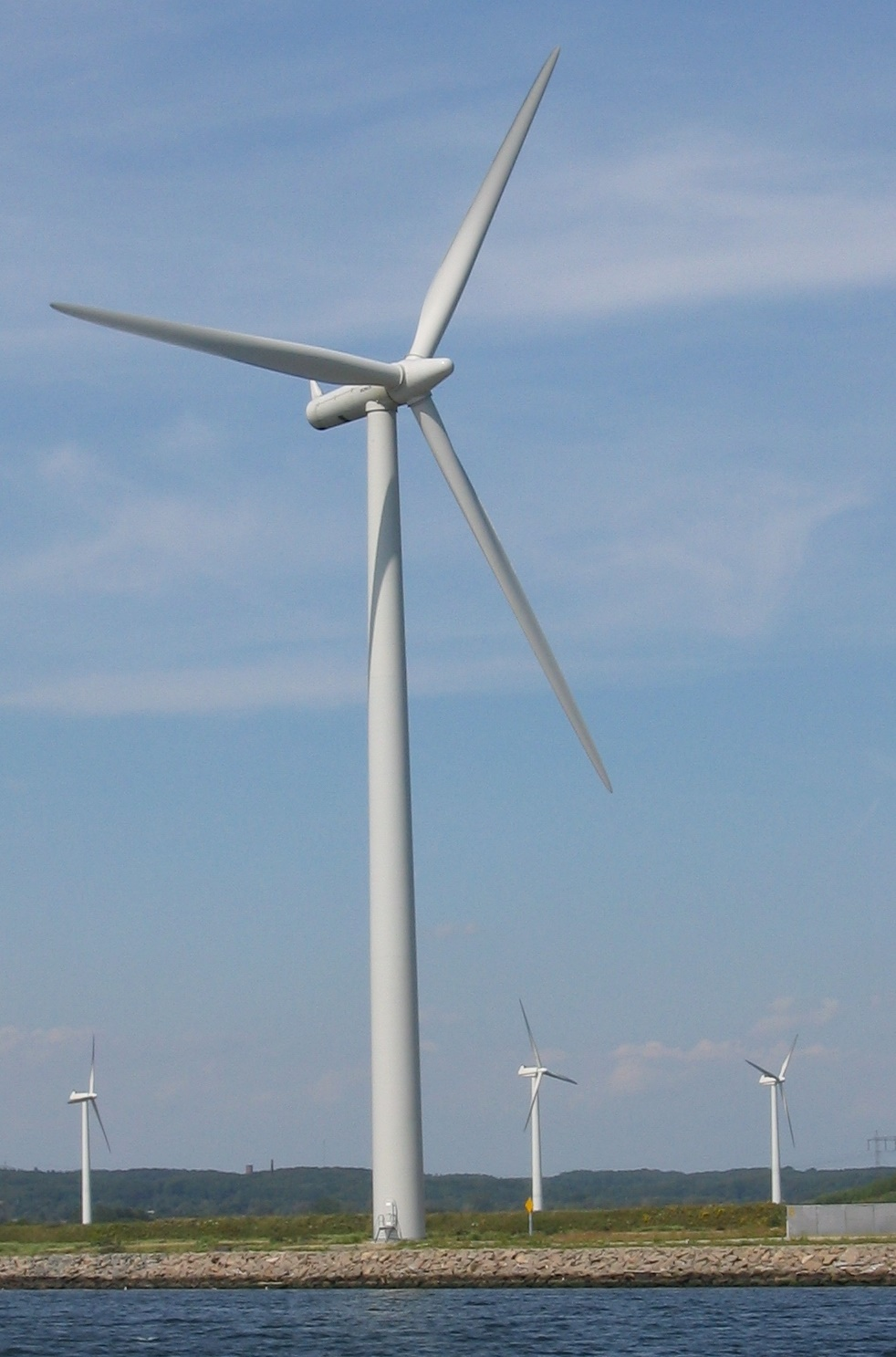
Wind turbines usually provide electrical generation in conjunction with other methods of producing power.

Electric generators transform kinetic energy into electricity. This is the most used form for generating electricity based on Faraday's law. It can be seen experimentally by rotating a magnet within closed loops of conducting material, e.g. copper wire. Almost all commercial electrical generation uses electromagnetic induction, in which mechanical energy forces a generator to rotate.

=== Electrochemistry ===
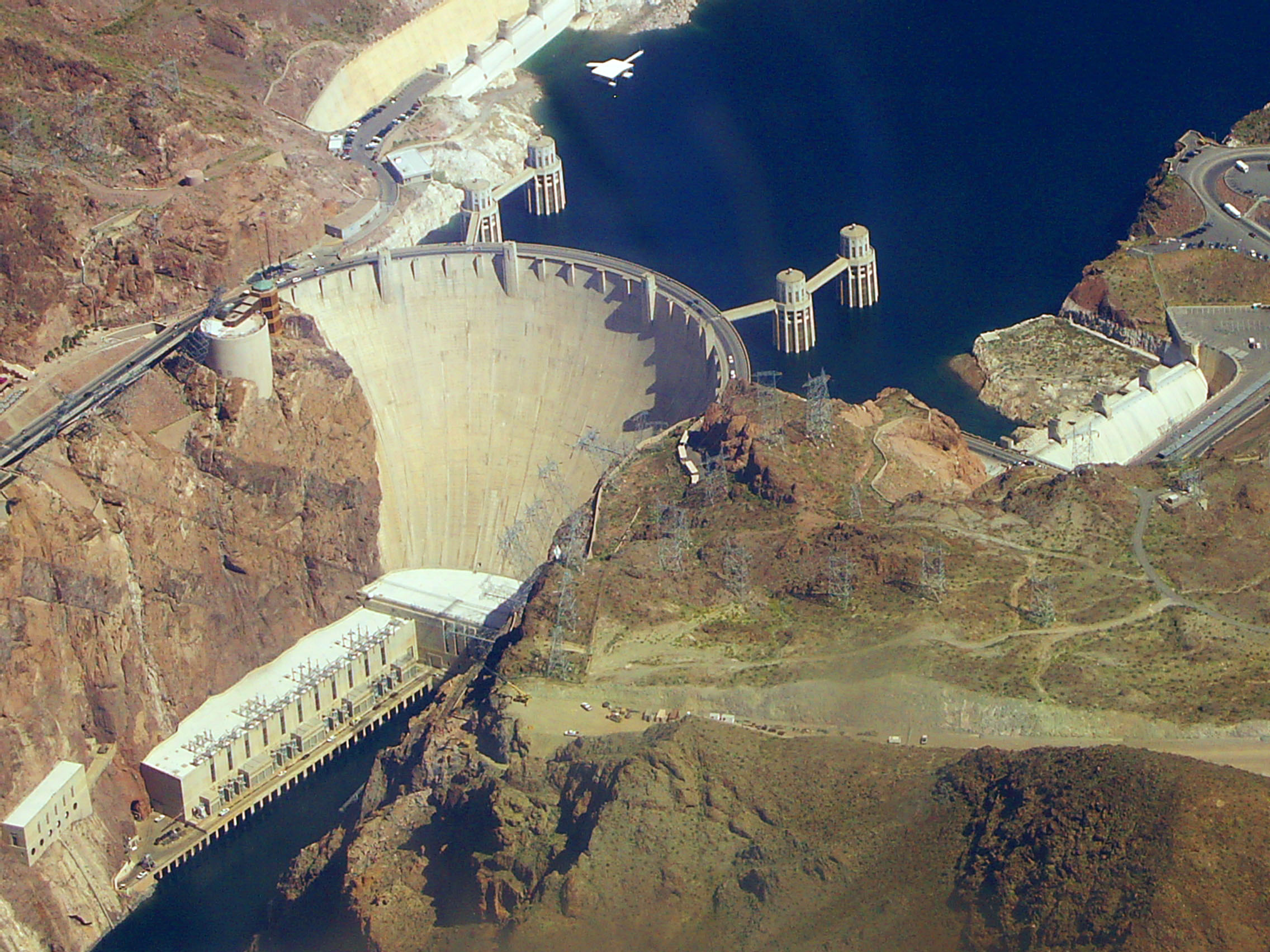
Large dams, such as Hoover Dam in the United States, can provide large amounts of hydroelectric power. It has an installed capacity of 2.07 GW.

Electrochemistry is the direct transformation of chemical energy into electricity, as in a battery. Electrochemical electricity generation is important in portable and mobile applications. Currently, most electrochemical power comes from batteries. Primary cells, such as the common zinc–carbon batteries, act as power sources directly, but secondary cells (i.e. rechargeable batteries) are used for storage systems rather than primary generation systems. Open electrochemical systems, known as fuel cells, can be used to extract power either from natural fuels or from synthesized fuels. Osmotic power is a possibility at places where salt and fresh water merge.

=== Photovoltaic effect ===
The photovoltaic effect is the transformation of light into electrical energy, as in solar cells. Photovoltaic panels convert sunlight directly to DC electricity. Power inverters can then convert that to AC electricity if needed. The photovoltaic industry has undergone spectacular growth since the 1990s.

== Economics ==
The selection of electricity production modes and their economic viability varies in accordance with demand and region. The economics vary considerably around the world, resulting in widespread residential selling prices. Hydroelectric plants, nuclear power plants, thermal power plants and renewable sources have their own pros and cons, and selection is based upon the local power requirement and the fluctuations in demand.

All power grids have varying loads on them. The daily minimum is the base load, often supplied by plants which run continuously. Nuclear, coal, oil, gas and some hydro plants can supply base load. If well construction costs for natural gas are below $10 per MWh, generating electricity from natural gas is cheaper than generating power by burning coal.

Nuclear power plants can produce a huge amount of power from a single unit. However, nuclear disasters have raised concerns over the safety of nuclear power, and the capital cost of nuclear plants is very high. Hydroelectric power plants are located in areas where the potential energy from falling water can be harnessed for moving turbines and the generation of power. It may not be an economically viable single source of production where the ability to store the flow of water is limited and the load varies too much during the annual production cycle.

== Generating equipment ==
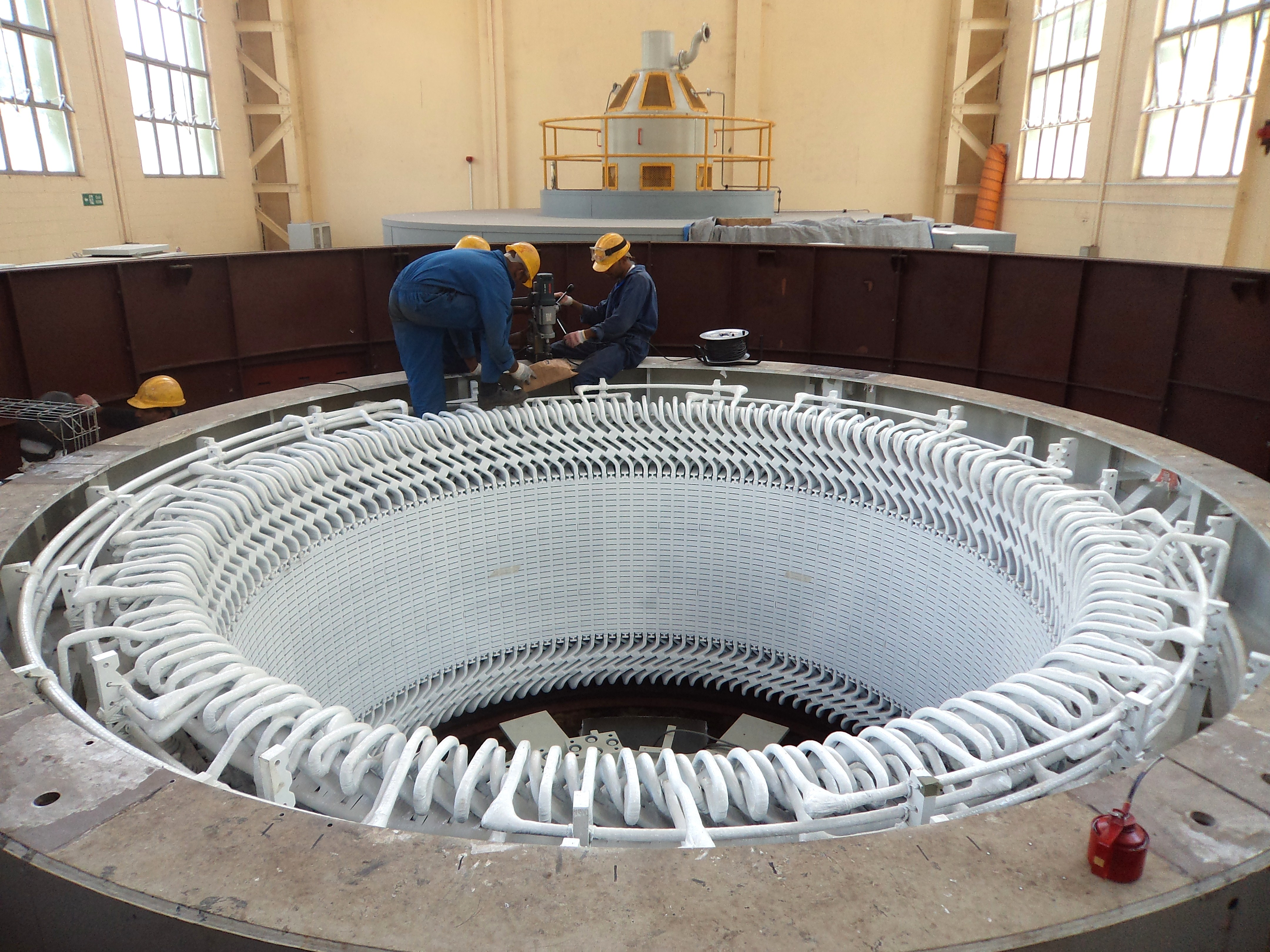
A large generator with the rotor removed

Electric generators were known in simple forms from the discovery of electromagnetic induction in the 1830s. In general, some form of prime mover such as an engine or the turbines described above, drives a rotating magnetic field past stationary coils of wire thereby turning mechanical energy into electricity. The only commercial scale forms of electricity production that do not employ a generator are photovoltaic solar and fuel cells.

=== Turbines ===
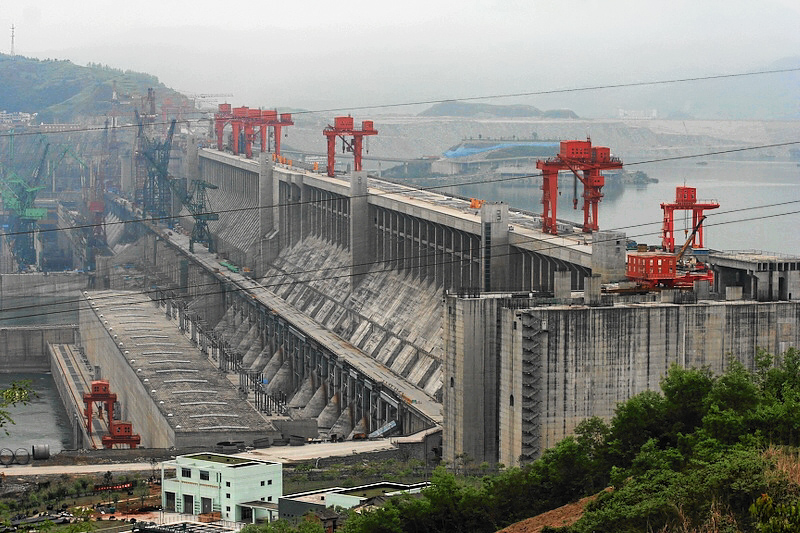
Large dams such as Three Gorges Dam in China can provide large amounts of hydroelectric power; it has a 22.5 GW capability.

Almost all commercial electrical power on Earth is generated with a turbine, driven by wind, water, steam or burning gas. The turbine drives a generator, thus transforming its mechanical energy into electrical energy by electromagnetic induction. There are many different methods of developing mechanical energy, including heat engines, hydro, wind and tidal power. Most electric generation is driven by heat engines.

The combustion of fossil fuels supplies most of the energy to these engines, with a significant fraction from nuclear fission and some from renewable sources. The modern steam turbine, invented by Sir Charles Parsons in 1884, currently generates about 55% of the electric power in the world using a variety of heat sources. Turbine types include:

- Steam
  - Water is boiled by coal burned in a thermal power plant. About 41% of all electricity is generated this way.
  - Nuclear fission heat created in a nuclear reactor creates steam. Less than 15% of electricity is generated this way.
  - Renewable energy. The steam is generated by biomass, solar thermal energy, or geothermal power.
- Natural gas: turbines are driven directly by gases produced by combustion. Combined cycle are driven by both steam and natural gas. They generate power by burning natural gas in a gas turbine and use residual heat to generate steam. At least 20% of the world's electricity is generated by natural gas.
- Water Energy is captured by a water turbine from the movement of water - from falling water, the rise and fall of tides or ocean thermal currents (see ocean thermal energy conversion). Currently, hydroelectric plants provide approximately 16% of the world's electricity.
- The windmill was a very early wind turbine. In 2018 around 5% of the world's electricity was produced from wind.

Turbines can also use other heat-transfer liquids than steam. Supercritical carbon dioxide based cycles can provide higher conversion efficiency due to faster heat exchange, higher energy density and simpler power cycle infrastructure. Supercritical carbon dioxide blends, that are currently in development, can further increase efficiency by optimizing its critical pressure and temperature points.

Although turbines are most common in commercial power generation, smaller generators can be powered by gasoline or diesel engines. These may used for backup generation or as a prime source of power within isolated villages.

== World production ==
Share of electricity production by source

Total world generation in 2024 was 30,850 TWh, including coal (34%), gas (22%), hydro (14%), nuclear (9%), wind (8%), solar (7%), oil and other fossil fuels (3%), biomass (2%).

== Environmental concerns ==
Variations between countries generating electrical power affect concerns about the environment. In France only 10% of electricity is generated from fossil fuels, the US is higher at 70% and China is at 80%. The cleanliness of electricity depends on its source. Methane leaks (from natural gas to fuel gas-fired power plants) and carbon dioxide emissions from fossil fuel-based electricity generation account for a significant portion of world greenhouse gas emissions. In the United States, fossil fuel combustion for electric power generation is responsible for 65% of all emissions of sulfur dioxide, the main component of acid rain. Electricity generation is the fourth highest combined source of NO_{x}, carbon monoxide, and particulate matter in the US.

According to the International Energy Agency (IEA), low-carbon electricity generation needs to account for 85% of global electrical output by 2040 in order to ward off the worst effects of climate change. Like other organizations including the Energy Impact Center (EIC) and the United Nations Economic Commission for Europe (UNECE), the IEA has called for the expansion of nuclear and renewable energy to meet that objective. Some, like EIC founder Bret Kugelmass, believe that nuclear power is the primary method for decarbonizing electricity generation because it can also power direct air capture that removes existing carbon emissions from the atmosphere. Nuclear power plants can also create district heating and desalination projects, limiting carbon emissions and the need for expanded electrical output.

A fundamental issue regarding centralised generation and the current electrical generation methods in use today is the significant negative environmental effects that many of the generation processes have. Processes such as coal and gas not only release carbon dioxide as they combust, but their extraction from the ground also impacts the environment. Open pit coal mines use large areas of land to extract coal and limit the potential for productive land use after the excavation. Natural gas extraction releases large amounts of methane into the atmosphere when extracted from the ground, which greatly increases global greenhouse gases. Although nuclear power plants do not release carbon dioxide through electricity generation, there are risks associated with nuclear waste and safety concerns associated with the use of nuclear sources.

Per unit of electricity generated coal and gas-fired power life-cycle greenhouse gas emissions are almost always at least ten times that of other generation methods.

Extreme heat events can negatively impact electrical power generation, transmission, and distribution, potentially leading to power outages (blackouts or brownouts). Increased ambient air temperature significantly reduces the efficiency of turbines, boilers and generators, affecting natural gas, oil, and nuclear power plants, but not coal or biomass plants. Increased water temperatures limit cooling capacity in fossil-fuel, geothermal, biomass and nuclear power plants. Hydropower generation may be decreased due to increased evaporation of water bodies, and photovoltaic electricity generation is reduced at elevated temperatures.

== Centralised and distributed generation ==
Centralised generation is electricity generation by large-scale centralised facilities, sent through transmission lines to consumers. These facilities are usually located far away from consumers and distribute the electricity through high voltage transmission lines to a substation, where it is then distributed to consumers; the basic concept being that multi-megawatt or gigawatt scale large stations create electricity for a large number of people. The vast majority of electricity used is created from centralised generation. Most centralised power generation comes from large power plants run by fossil fuels such as coal or natural gas, though nuclear or large hydroelectricity plants are also commonly used.

Centralised generation is fundamentally the opposite of distributed generation. Distributed generation is the small-scale generation of electricity to smaller groups of consumers. This can also include independently producing electricity by either solar or wind power. In recent years distributed generation as has seen a spark in popularity due to its propensity to use renewable energy generation methods such as rooftop solar.

== Technologies ==
Centralised energy sources are large power plants that produce huge amounts of electricity to a large number of consumers. Most power plants used in centralised generation are thermal power plants meaning that they use a fuel to heat steam to produce a pressurised gas which in turn spins a turbine and generates electricity. This is the traditional way of producing energy. This process relies on several forms of technology to produce widespread electricity, these being natural coal, gas and nuclear forms of thermal generation. More recently solar and wind have become large scale.

=== Solar ===
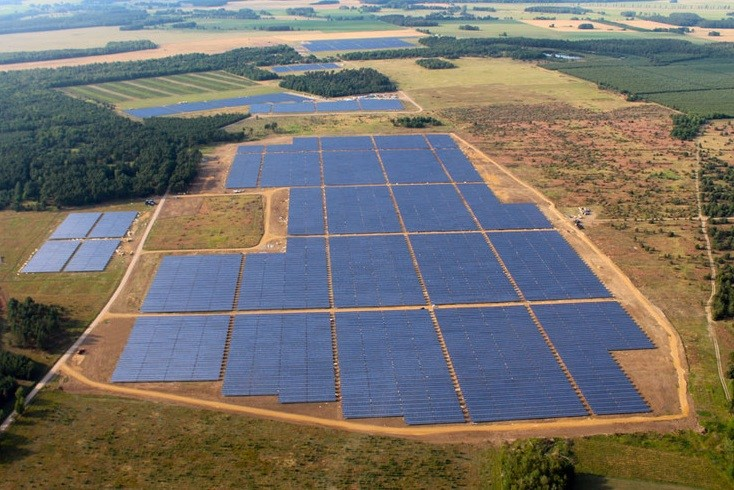
The 40.5 MW Jännersdorf Solar Park in Prignitz, Germany

A photovoltaic power station, also known as a solar park, solar farm, or solar power plant, is a large-scale grid-connected photovoltaic power system (PV system) designed for the supply of merchant power. They are different from most building-mounted and other decentralized solar power because they supply power at the utility level, rather than to a local user or users. Utility-scale solar is sometimes used to describe this type of project.

This approach differs from concentrated solar power, the other major large-scale solar generation technology, which uses heat to drive a variety of conventional generator systems. Both approaches have their own advantages and disadvantages, but to date, for a variety of reasons, photovoltaic technology has seen much wider use. As of 2019, about 97% of utility-scale solar power capacity was PV.

In some countries, the nameplate capacity of photovoltaic power stations is rated in megawatt-peak (MW_{p}), which refers to the solar array's theoretical maximum DC power output. In other countries, the manufacturer states the surface and the efficiency. However, Canada, Japan, Spain, and the United States often specify using the converted lower nominal power output in MW_{AC}, a measure more directly comparable to other forms of power generation. Most solar parks are developed at a scale of at least 1 MW_{p}. As of 2018, the world's largest operating photovoltaic power stations surpassed 1 gigawatt. At the end of 2019, about 9,000 solar farms were larger than 4 MW_{AC} (utility scale), with a combined capacity of over 220 GW_{AC}.

Most of the existing large-scale photovoltaic power stations are owned and operated by independent power producers, but the involvement of community and utility-owned projects is increasing. Previously, almost all were supported at least in part by regulatory incentives such as feed-in tariffs or tax credits, but as levelized costs fell significantly in the 2010s and grid parity has been reached in most markets, external incentives are usually not needed.

=== Hydroelectricity ===
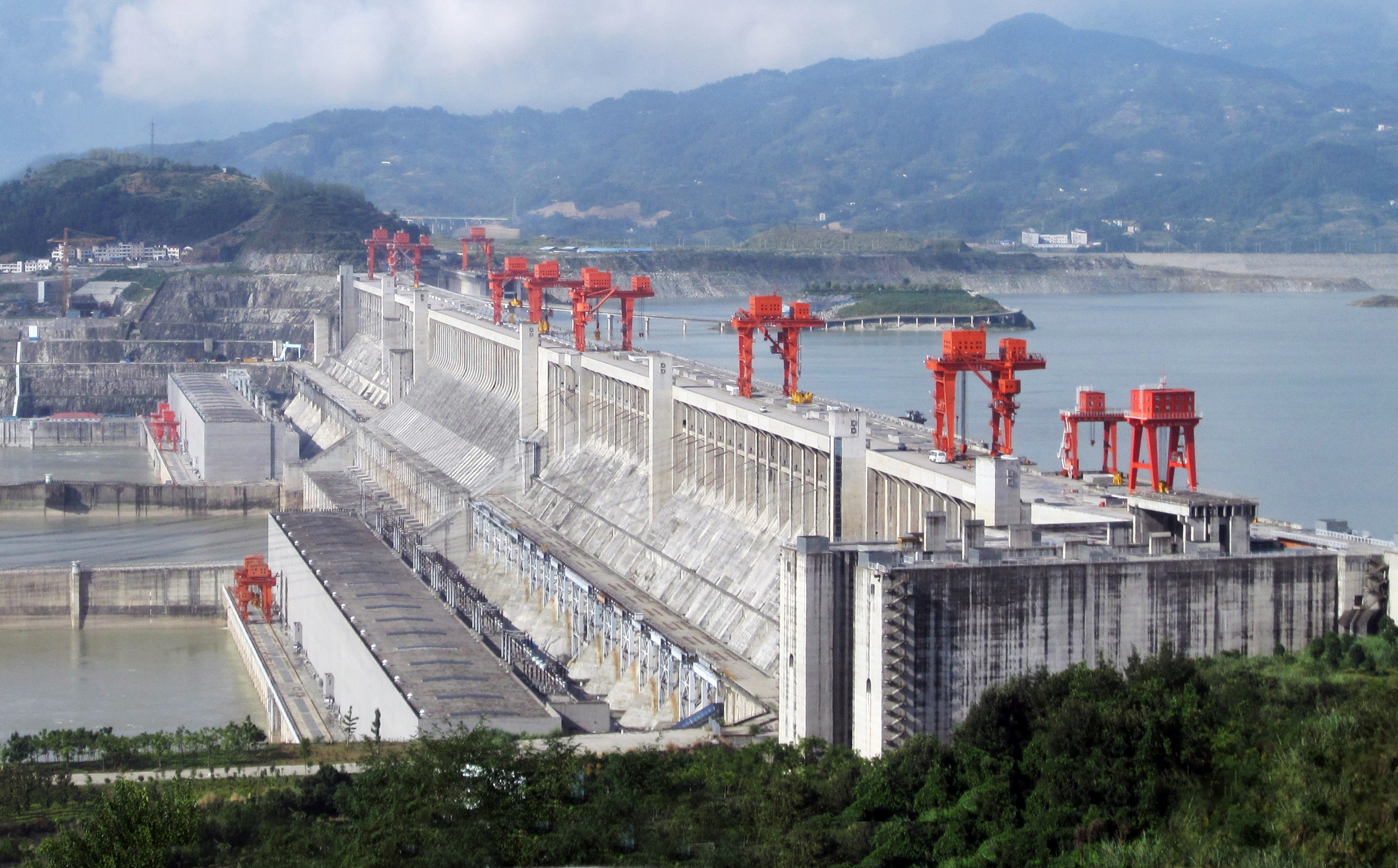
The Three Gorges Dam in Central China is the world's largest power-producing facility of any kind.

Hydroelectricity is electricity generated from hydropower (water power). Hydropower supplies 15% of the world's electricity, almost 4,210 TWh in 2023, which is more than all other renewable sources combined and also more than nuclear power. Hydropower can provide large amounts of low-carbon electricity on demand, making it a key element for creating secure and clean electricity supply systems. A hydroelectric power station that has a dam and reservoir is a flexible source, since the amount of electricity produced can be increased or decreased in seconds or minutes in response to varying electricity demand.

=== Wind ===
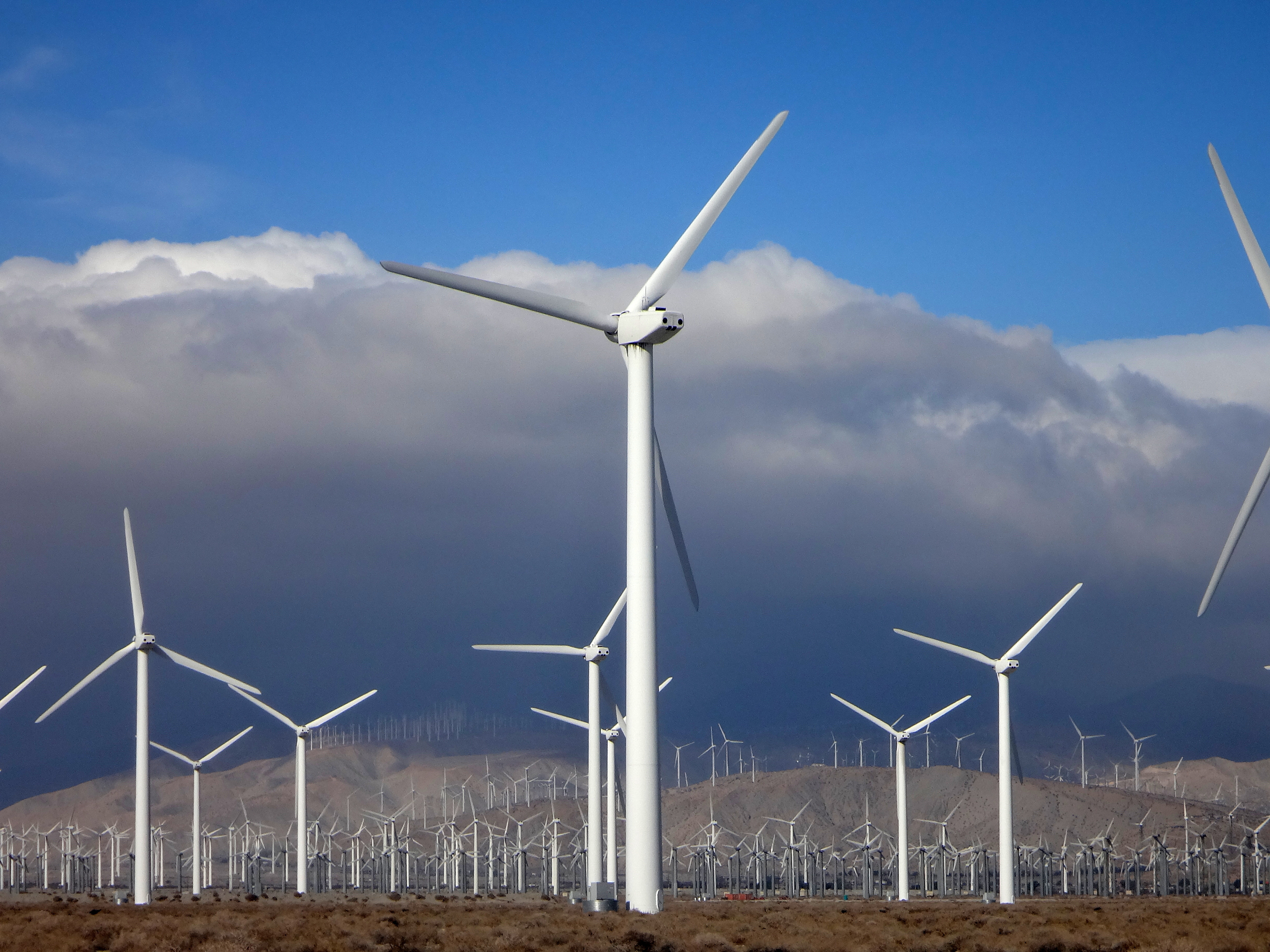
The San Gorgonio Pass wind farm in California, United States

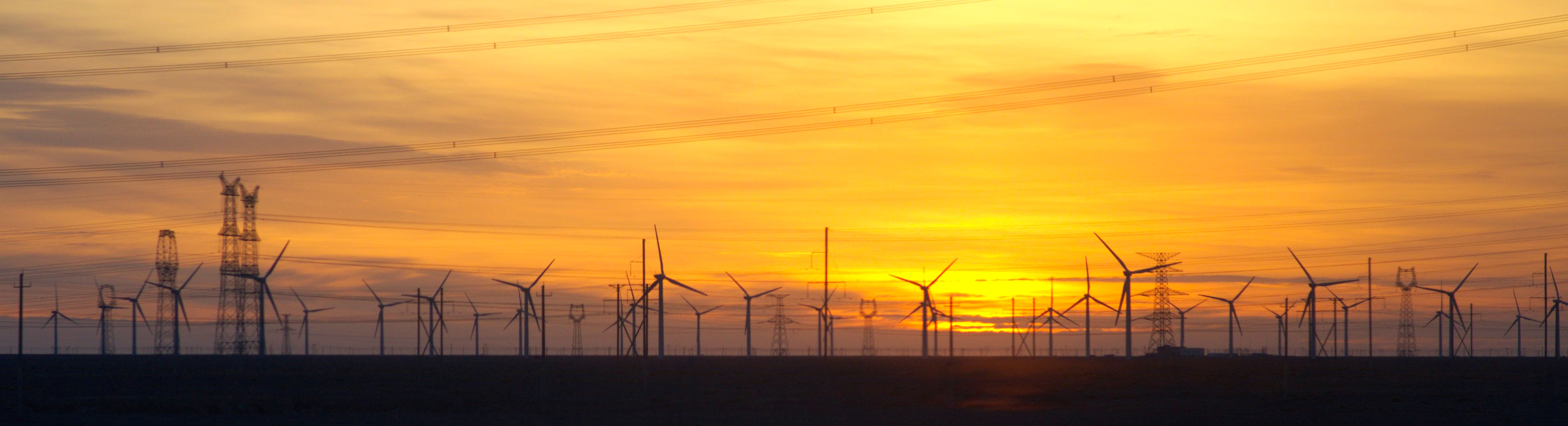
The Gansu Wind Farm in China is the largest wind farm in the world, with a target capacity of 20,000 MW by 2020.

A wind farm, also called a wind park or wind power plant, is a group of wind turbines in the same location used to produce electricity. Wind farms vary in size from a small number of turbines to several hundred wind turbines covering an extensive area. Wind farms may be either onshore or offshore.

Many of the largest operational onshore wind farms are located in China, India, and the United States. For example, the largest wind farm in the world, Gansu Wind Farm in China had a capacity of more than 6,000 MW by 2012, with a goal of 20,000 MW by 2020. As of December 2020, the 1218 MW Hornsea Wind Farm in the UK is the largest offshore wind farm in the world. Individual wind turbine designs continue to increase in power, resulting in fewer turbines being needed for the same total output.

Because they require no fuel, wind farms have less of an effect on the environment than many other forms of power generation and are often referred to as a good source of green energy. Wind farms have, however, been criticised for their visual and landscape effects. Typically they need to be spread over more land than other power stations and need to be built in wild and rural areas, which may lead to "industrialization of the countryside", habitat loss, and a drop in tourism. Some critics claim that wind farms have adverse health effects, but most researchers consider these claims to be pseudoscience (see wind turbine syndrome). Wind farms can interfere with radar, although in most cases, according to the U.S. Department of Energy, "siting and other mitigations have resolved conflicts and allowed wind projects to co-exist effectively with radar".

=== Coal ===
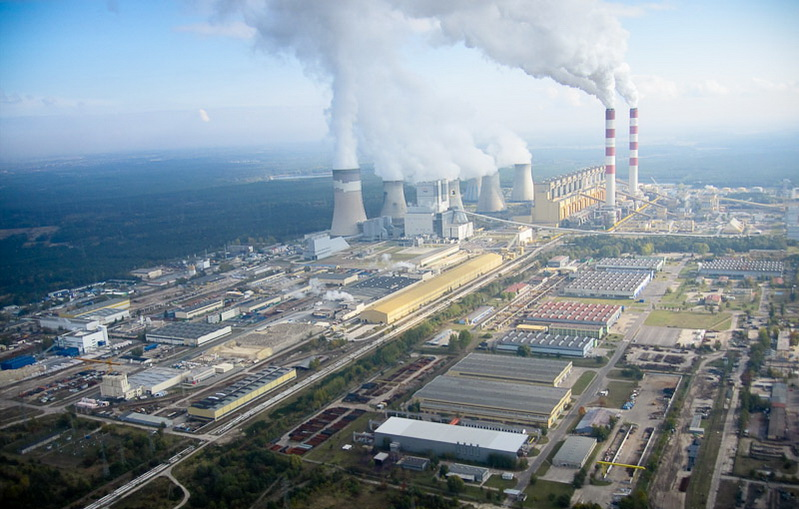
Bełchatów Power Station in Bełchatów, Poland

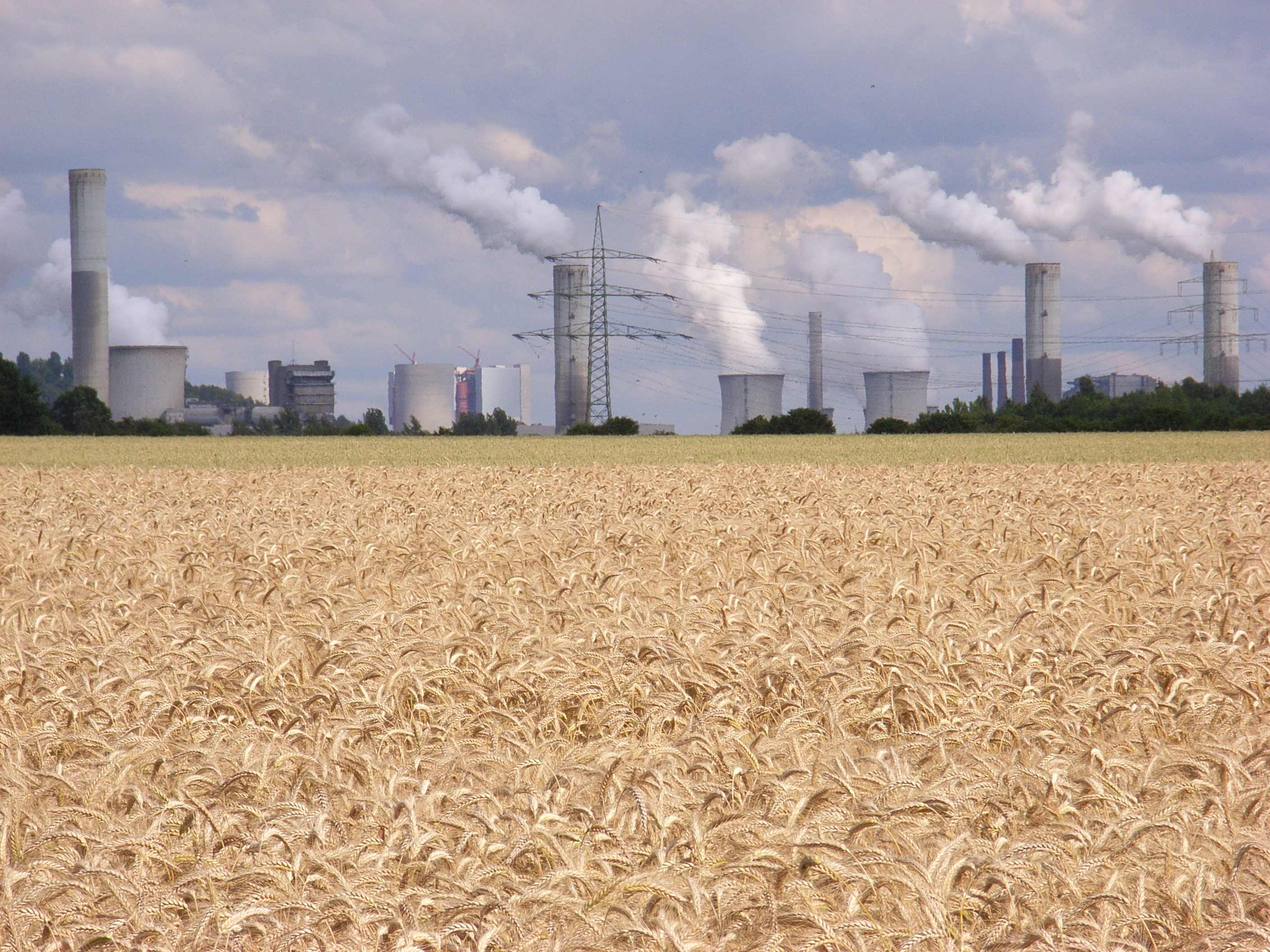
Frimmersdorf Power Station in Grevenbroich, Germany

Coal-fired power station diagram

Share of electricity production from coal

A coal-fired power station or coal power plant is a thermal power station which burns coal to generate electricity. Worldwide there are about 2,500 coal-fired power stations, on average capable of generating a gigawatt each. (Note: The number 7120 in the cite is actually the number of units - as explained by Global Energy Monitor plants may have more than one unit.) They generate about a third of the world's electricity, but cause many illnesses and the most early deaths per unit of energy produced, mainly from air pollution. By far the most coal power capacity is in China, followed by India and the United States. The coal trade between miners and consumers averaged about $100 per short ton in 2025.

A coal-fired power station is a type of fossil fuel power station. The coal is usually pulverized and then burned in a pulverized coal-fired boiler. The furnace heat converts boiler water to steam, which is then used to spin turbines that turn generators. Thus chemical energy stored in coal is converted successively into thermal energy, mechanical energy and, finally, electrical energy.

Coal-fired power stations are the largest single contributor to climate change, releasing approximately 12 billion tonnes of carbon dioxide annually, about one-fifth of global greenhouse gas emissions. China accounts for over half of global coal-fired electricity generation. While the total number of operational coal plants began declining in 2020, due to retirements in Europe and the Americas, construction continues in Asia, primarily in China and Southeast Asia. The profitability of some plants is maintained by externalities, as the health and environmental costs of coal production and use are not fully reflected in electricity prices. However, newer plants face the risk of becoming stranded assets. This is a particular risk in Southeast Asia, one of the world regions with the highest growth in coal power plants.

The UN Secretary General has called for OECD nations to phase out coal-fired generation by 2030, and the rest of the world by 2040.

=== Natural gas ===
Natural gas is ignited to create pressurised gas which is used to spin turbines to generate electricity. Natural gas plants use a gas turbine where natural gas is added along with oxygen which in turn combusts and expands through the turbine to force a generator to spin.

Natural gas power plants are more efficient than coal power generation, they however contribute to climate change, but not as highly as coal generation. Not only do they produce carbon dioxide from the ignition of natural gas, the extraction of gas when mined releases a significant amount of methane into the atmosphere.

=== Nuclear ===
Nuclear power plants create electricity through steam turbines where the heat input is from the process of nuclear fission. Currently, nuclear power produces 11% of all electricity in the world. Most nuclear reactors use uranium as a source of fuel. In a process called nuclear fission, energy, in the form of heat, is released when nuclear atoms are split. Electricity is created through the use of a nuclear reactor where heat produced by nuclear fission is used to produce steam which in turn spins turbines and powers the generators. Although there are several types of nuclear reactors, all fundamentally use this process.

Normal emissions due to nuclear power plants are primarily waste heat and radioactive spent fuel. In a reactor accident, significant amounts of radioisotopes can be released to the environment, posing a long term hazard to life. This hazard has been a continuing concern of environmentalists. Accidents such as the Three Mile Island accident, Chernobyl disaster and the Fukushima nuclear disaster illustrate this problem.

== Electricity generation capacity by country ==
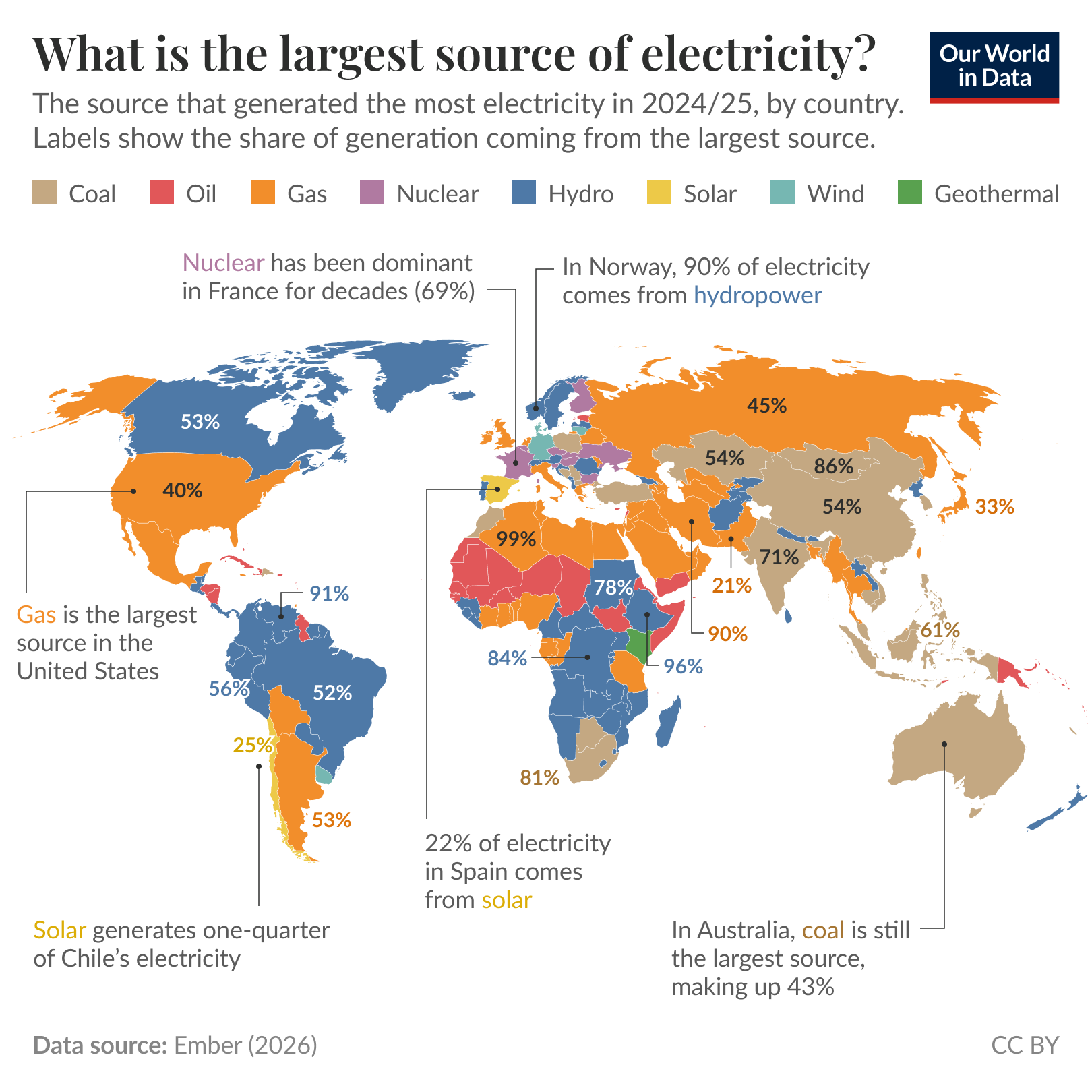
Map of the largest source of electricity by country

The table lists 45 countries with their total electricity capacities. The data is from 2022. According to the Energy Information Administration, the total global electricity capacity in 2022 was nearly 8.9 terawatt (TW), more than four times the total global electricity capacity in 1981. The global average per-capita electricity capacity was about 1,120 watts in 2022, nearly two and a half times the global average per-capita electricity capacity in 1981.

Iceland has the highest installed capacity per capita in the world, at about 8,990 watts. All developed countries have an average per-capita electricity capacity above the global average per-capita electricity capacity, with the United Kingdom having the lowest average per-capita electricity capacity of all other developed countries.

Country	Total capacity (GW)	Average per capita capacity (watts)
World	8,890	1,120
China	2,510	1,740
United States	1,330	3,940
European Union	1,080	2,420
India	556	397
Japan	370	2,940
Russia	296	2,030
Germany	267	3,220
Brazil	222	1,030
Canada	167	4,460
South Korea	160	3,130
France	148	2,280
Italy	133	2,230
Spain	119	2,580
United Kingdom	111	1,640
Turkey	107	1,240
Mexico	104	792
Australia	95.8	3,680
Saudi Arabia	85.3	2,380
Iran	83.3	977
Vietnam	72.2	721
South Africa	66.7	1,100
Poland	64	1,690
Thailand	63	901
Ukraine	62.2	1,440
Egypt	61.1	582
Taiwan	58	2,440
Netherlands	53.3	3,010
Sweden	52.1	5,100
Argentina	51.9	1,130
Pakistan	42.7	192
Norway	41.7	7,530
United Arab Emirates	40.7	4,010
Malaysia	37.9	1,110
Chile	37	1,930
Venezuela	34.1	1,210
Kazakhstan	29.6	1,600
Switzerland	27.8	2,960
Austria	26.7	2,890
Algeria	25.9	590
Greece	24.4	2,400
Israel	23.7	2,520
Finland	22.2	3,980
Denmark	21.3	3,710
(Republic of Ireland) Ireland	13.3	2,420
New Zealand	11.6	2,320
Iceland	3.24	8,990

== See also ==
- Glossary of power generation
- Cogeneration: the use of a heat engine or power station to generate electricity and useful heat at the same time.
- Cost of electricity by source
- Diesel generator
- Engine–generator
- Generation expansion planning
- Steam–electric power station
- World energy supply and consumption
