= Hydrosol =

Hydrosol may refer to:

- Sol (colloid) of which the dispersion medium is water
- Herbal distillate
