= Glossary of power generation =

The following is a list of common definitions related to power generation.

== A ==
| Term | Explanation and discussion | References and related terms |
|---|---|---|
| Abatement | Effort to avoid emission of carbon dioxide Undertaking abatement activities on a power plant would serve to reduce its carbon intensity. | Carbon intensity |
| AGC | Automatic generation control Used by the system operators to control the output of generators connected to the electricity network | Governor (device) |

== B ==
| Term | Explanation and discussion | References and related terms |
|---|---|---|
| Bagasse | Waste plant fibre left after the juices have been removed from sugar cane by crushing. Burning bagasse in boilers at sugar mills is a common form of renewable energy using biomass. | Biomass |
| Bag filter | A casing containing thousands of long cloth bags used to remove fly ash from flue gas. The bags are back-flushed using compressed air. | Precipitator |
| Barring | The process of slowly turning the turbine-generator shaft to prevent bowing while it is still hot after shutdown Typically, barring is achieved using turning gear, a small electric motor and gearbox connected to the generator shaft. Early in the history of power plants, barring was done by operators turning the shaft with a bar. This is still done if electric barring is not available, as the consequences of bowing a shaft are enormous. | Turning gear |
| Biomass | Living or recently dead material such as plant matter, used as either fuel or industrial production as biofuel It is a renewable resource obtained from several different plants, for example wood waste, sugar cane, corn, hemp and others. | Biofuel |
| Black start | Starting a unit without external power supply from the electricity network In the context of an electricity market, that capability of completing a black start is known as system restart ancillary service (SRAS). Black start capability is typically provided by a local gas turbine, generating sufficient electrical power to drive pumps and fans on only one unit in the power station until it comes online. Once that unit is up, it can provide auxiliary power to the others at the same location, or feed into the grid again. A black start does not require a synchronising step as the network is down, but subsequent generators coming online will need to synchronise. | Ancillary services |
| Blade | In a reaction turbine, the blade is the main moving part attached to the turbine shaft It extracts the pressure and heat energy from the steam and converts it to rotating mechanical energy by turning the shaft. | Reaction turbine |
| Bled steam | Steam extracted from the turbine to provide heat to the feedwater heaters Note that the deaerator is also a feedwater heater – it also receives bled steam from the turbine, but the steam is mixed with and heats the water instead of transferring heat through a shell and tube heat exchanger. | LP heater, HP heater, deaerator, auxiliary steam |

== C ==
| Term | Explanation and discussion | References and related terms |
|---|---|---|
| CAES | Compressed air energy storage | Grid energy storage |

== D ==
| Term | Explanation and discussion | References and related terms |
|---|---|---|
| DAF | Dry ash free An analysis of coal based on removal of water and ash from the coal sample | Coal; Bottom ash; Fly ash; Ash (analytical chemistry); Proximate analysis |

== E ==
| Term | Explanation and discussion | References and related terms |
|---|---|---|
| EAF | Equivalent availability factor Calculation of availability based on unit outages and load reductions | EFOR, KPI, availability |

== F ==
| Term | Explanation and discussion | References and related terms |
|---|---|---|
| FCAS | Frequency control ancillary service, ramp rate regulation | |

== G ==
| Term | Explanation and discussion | References and related terms |
|---|---|---|
| Gasification | A chemical process that converts a solid fuel into gases. Where the gasification is carried out immediately prior to combustion in a combined cycle gas turbine, this configuration is known as IGCC. Gasification of coal may also be carried out underground, as in UCG. Finally, some gasification plants target synthetic oils as the end products, in gas to liquid. | IGCC; GTL |

== H ==
| Term | Explanation and discussion | References and related terms |
|---|---|---|
| Heat rate | The amount of fuel energy required to produce electrical energy Heat rate is the inverse of efficiency, incorporating a factor of 3600 due to the differing units of fuel energy (kJ) and electrical energy (kWh) – there are 3600 kJ in 1 kWh. | Efficiency |

== I ==
| Term | Explanation and discussion | References and related terms |
|---|---|---|
| Ionisation | Heating the atoms or molecules of a gas so that the electrons dissociate from the nuclei. By this means a gas transitions into the plasma phase. Transition between the liquid and gas phases is called evaporation and condensation. | Plasma (physics); Condensation; Evaporation |

== J ==
| Term | Explanation and discussion | References and related terms |
|---|---|---|
| Joule–Thomson effect | The phenomenon where a gas or liquid changes temperature when it experiences a pressure drop If this pressure drop occurs as the gas passes through a valve or other restriction, this would be called a throttling process. The effect is applied in air conditioning and refrigeration equipment, which incorporates a thermal expansion (TX) valve. | Thermal expansion valve |

== K ==
| Term | Explanation and discussion | References and related terms |
|---|---|---|
| Kyoto Protocol | An international agreement made in 1997 that sets emissions reduction targets for developed countries and establishes mechanisms to reduce the emissions of developing countries The Kyoto Protocol is an addendum to the United Nations Framework Convention on Climate Change. The protocol includes the Clean Development Mechanism (CDM), designed to encourage energy-efficiency initiatives in developing countries. The Certified Emission Reduction (CER) process validates the effect of the initiatives. | CDM; CER |

== L ==
| Term | Explanation and discussion | References and related terms |
|---|---|---|
| Labyrinth seal | Strips and grooves on a shaft that provide a torturous path for sealing steam Used in sealing of steam on turbine shafts, and sealing of oil and hydrogen on generator shafts. | Gland seal |

== M ==
| Term | Explanation and discussion | References and related terms |
|---|---|---|
| Mollier chart | Enthalpy–enthalpy diagram, showing the enthalpy on the vertical axis, and the entropy on the horizontal axis This chart is useful for calculating the turbine isentropic efficiency, as a vertical line represents expansion at constant entropy, and the height of the line is the enthalpy drop. Also known as h-s diagram. | T-s chart |
| Max cap | Maximum capacity One of three modes describing the configuration of the unit around full load Usually achieved by taking the HP heaters out of service, so that the bled steam that normally goes to these heaters now passes through the turbine. This increases the capacity of the turbine due to the increased steam flow, but reduces the efficiency as the boiler must fire much harder due to the colder incoming water. Also known as overload operation. | Valves wide open; Maximum continuous rating |

== N ==
| Term | Explanation and discussion | References and related terms |
|---|---|---|
| Natural draft | A cooling tower design that uses natural convection currents of hot air to draw air into the tower to cool the water Typically, natural draft cooling towers are constructed as hyperboloid lattice steel and concrete. The shape is for structure not airflow. | Mechanical draft |

== O ==
| Term | Explanation and discussion | References and related terms |
|---|---|---|
| OCGT | Open-cycle gas turbine A simple configuration of gas turbine including a compressor, combustion chambers and turbine The open-cycle gas turbine uses the Brayton cycle. | CCGT; Brayton cycle |

== P ==
| Term | Explanation and discussion | References and related terms |
|---|---|---|
| PA | Primary air This term typically applies to fans, that is, primary air fans supply air to the pulverisers to carry pulverised fuel from the pulveriser to the burners. The term also applies to ductwork relating to the primary air system, for example hot and cold primary air ducts and dampers lead to the pulverisers. | * |

== Q ==
| Term | Explanation and discussion | References and related terms |

== R ==
| Term | Explanation and discussion | References and related terms |
|---|---|---|
| Rankine cycle | The thermodynamic cycle used by most boiler–turbine generating units This cycle includes addition of heat in the boiler, extraction of energy through expansion of steam in the turbine, and rejection of heat using the condenser and cooling tower. | Brayton cycle |
| Reaction turbine | Design of a Turbine where energy is extracted from the steam predominantly by a change in pressure of the steam The vanes (stationary components fixed to the casing) direct the steam toward the blades (rotating components attached to the rotor) which produce a force on the rotor in a way similar to an aeroplane wing. The shape of the blade causes a difference in steam from one side of the blade to the other, causing the rotor to turn. | Impulse turbine |

== S ==
| Term | Explanation and discussion | References and related terms |
|---|---|---|
| SA | Sealing air The sealing air fan provides air pressure to joints and seals around the moving parts of the pulveriser to prevent pulverised fuel and primary air leaking out. | Pulverizer |
| Safety valve | A flow control device designed to prevent the pressure in a vessel exceeding its design pressure | Pressure vessel; Non-return valve |

== T ==
| Term | Explanation and discussion | References and related terms | |
|---|---|---|---|
| Tandem compound | A design of turbine where multiple cylinders are arranged in line on a single shaft | Cross compound | |
| Tap changer | A device in a transformer to change the number of coils used | Since the voltage ratio of a transformer is based on the ratio of the number of turns between the primary and secondary coils, changing the number of turns changes the voltage. | Transformer |
| TDS | Total dissolved solids A measure of the impurities contained in cooling water Circulating water with high TDS will tend to form a scale on the inside of condenser tubes. | Langelier saturation index | |

== U ==
| Term | Explanation and discussion | References and related terms |
|---|---|---|
| UCG | Underground coal gasification A process to convert coal to gas which occurs underground Coal, and volatiles embedded in the coal (mostly methane) are partially combusted in the presence of steam, oxygen and / or air, to produce hydrogen and carbon monoxide. UCG may be combined with GTL to produce liquid hydrocarbons from low-value coal reserves. This is known as coal to liquid (CTL). | Gasification |
| Ultimate analysis | The detailed chemical analysis of a fuel that indicates the contents of carbon, hydrogen, sulphur, nitrogen, chlorine, oxygen, and ash – as percentages by mass In some analyses, the ash content may be listed as the specific elements, for example silicon and iron, as these determine the ash fusion temperature and associated slagging behaviour. | Proximate analysis; Ash fusion temperature; REF slagging |

== V ==
| Term | Explanation and discussion | References and related terms |
|---|---|---|
| Valves wide open | One of three modes describing the configuration of the unit around full load As the name implies, in this mode the governor valves are positioned at 100%. The boiler is at rated pressure. Often abbreviated as VWO. | Maximum continuous rating |
| V2G | Vehicle to grid Supplying the electricity network with electricity stored in the batteries of battery electric vehicles or plug-in hybrid electric vehicles | Battery electric vehicle; Plug-in electric vehicle; Hybrid electric vehicle; Grid energy storage |

== W ==
| Term | Explanation and discussion | References and related terms |
|---|---|---|
| Warm start | Start of a unit after a shutdown of less than 96 hours but more than 6 hours The type of warm start, or whether it is in fact a cold start, depends on the degree of cooling experienced by the boiler and turbine during the shutdown. For example, the boiler may have been subjected to a forced cool to enable rapid progress on repair of a tube leak. | Forced cool; Hot start; Cold start |

== X ==
| Term | Explanation and discussion | References and related terms |
|---|---|---|
| X and Y protection | Duplicated electrical protection schemes in a power plant control system Typically, protection of electrical power systems is duplicated to ensure that the plant remains properly secure in the event of a failure of one of the protection systems. To ensure that the protection systems are completely independent of each other, they are installed by different vendors. | |

== Y ==
| Term | Explanation and discussion | References and related terms |
|---|---|---|
| Yaw | Movement of a wind turbine nacelle from side to side. When the wind direction changes, this movement orients the rotor to the direction of the wind, to maximise the power output. | Degrees of freedom (mechanics) |

== Z ==
| Term | Explanation and discussion | References and related terms |
