= Supercritical carbon dioxide blend =

Homogeneous mixture of CO2

Carbon dioxide phase diagram

Supercritical carbon dioxide blend (sCO_{2} blend) is an homogeneous mixture of CO_{2} with one or more fluids (dopant fluid) where it is held at or above its critical temperature and critical pressure.

Carbon dioxide behaves as a supercritical fluid above its critical temperature (304.13 K, 31.0 °C, 87.8 °F) and critical pressure (7.3773 MPa, 72.8 atm, 1,070 psi, 73.8 bar), expanding to fill its container like a gas but with a density like that of a liquid.

By combining CO_{2} with other fluids, the critical temperature and critical pressure of the mixture can be modified. The s-CO_{2} blend is usually designed to increase the mixture supercritical temperature to employ the s-CO_{2} in power cycles, obtaining increased energy conversion efficiency.

== Applications ==
=== Power generation ===
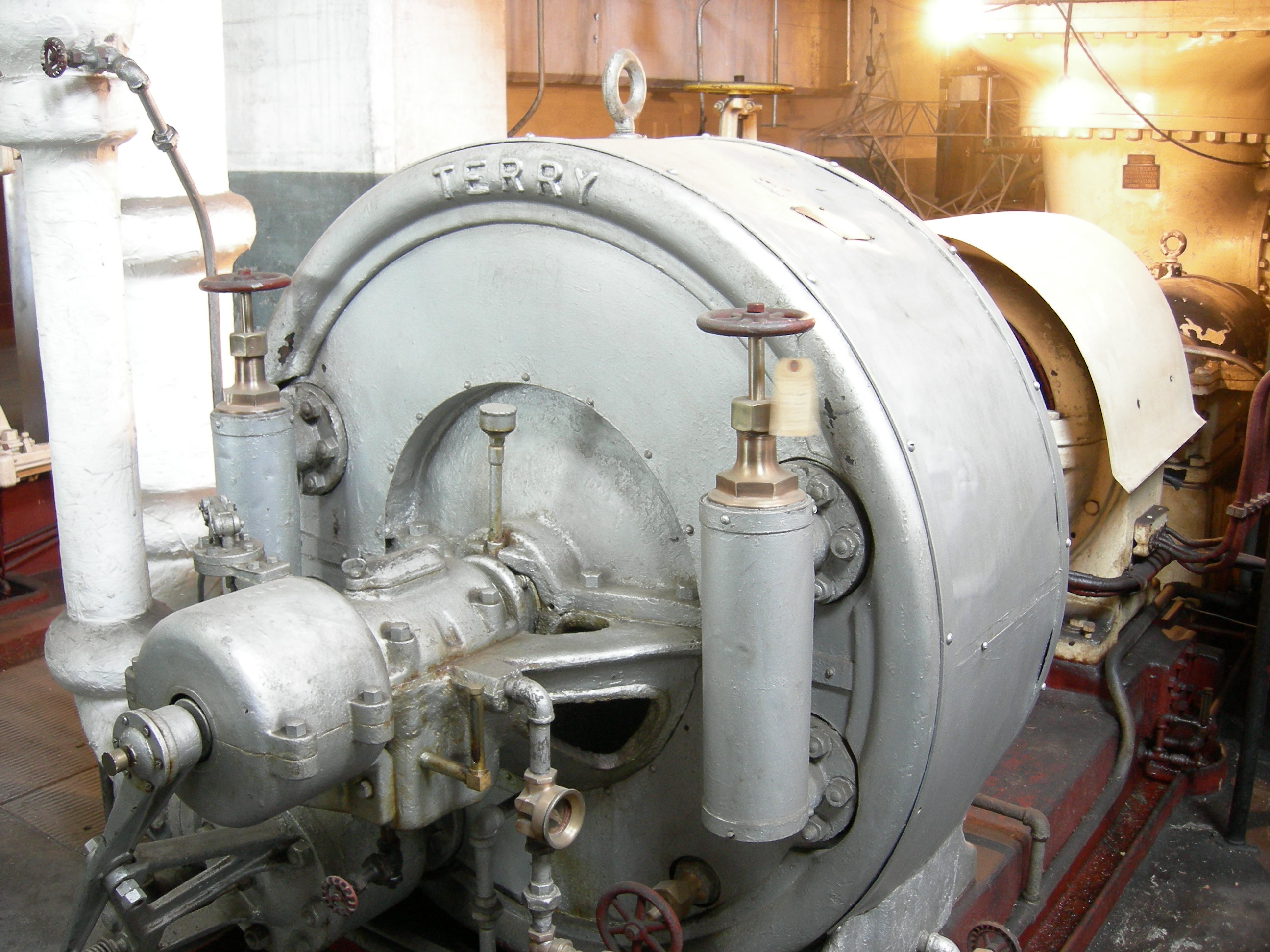
Steam turbine

Despite the development of new electricity generation technologies, most power plants are thermal power stations, meaning that they use a heat source (solar thermal, nuclear power, fossil fuel, biomass, Incineration, geothermal) to produce electricity. Although this process can be achieved directly by using the seebeck effect, the power conversion efficiency is greatly increased by using a power cycle. Traditionally, power plants are based on Rankine cycle and use steam turbines for electricity generation. The efficiency of the power cycle is limited by the temperature difference between the heat source and the heat sink. The greater the differential, the more electricity can be produced. Replacing steam by supercritical carbon dioxide allows reaching a higher temperature differential, therefore increasing the power efficiency of the power plant.

Supercritical state facilitates the heat exchange at the heat source. Furthermore, supercritical carbon dioxide is twice as dense as steam, and the combination of high density and volumetric heat makes it a high energy dense fluid, meaning that the size of most components of the thermodynamic cycle can be reduced. Therefore, the ecological footprint of the plant and the capital expenditure are considerably reduced. In addition, sCO_{2} is non-flammable, non-explosive, cheap and has comparably low toxicity. Efficiency can be further increased employing a combined cycle.

One of the main limitations that has delayed the massive use of carbon dioxide in power cycles is the corrosion engineering. Materials for the fluid transport and power generation must display high resistance to high temperature, corrosion and creep.

=== Concentrated Solar Power ===
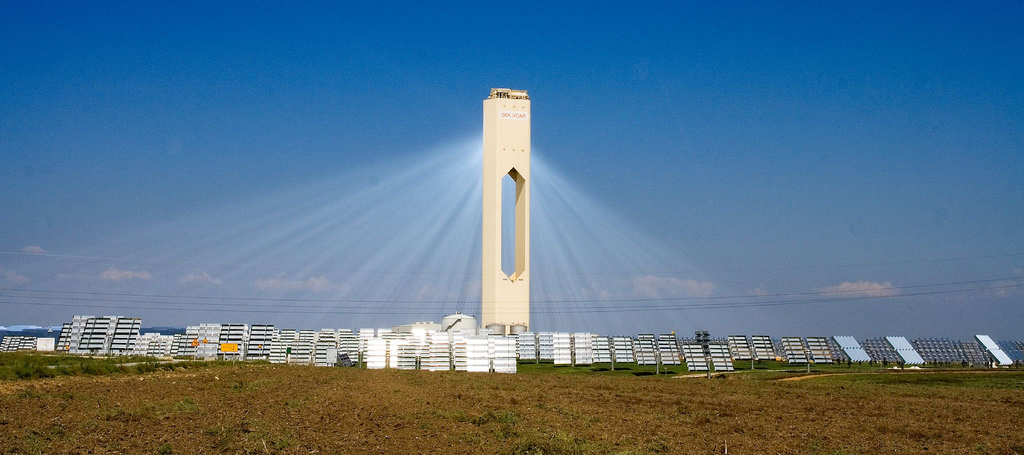
Solúcar PS 10, the first commercial solar power tower plant. It is located in Sanlúcar la Mayor, Seville, Spain.

Concentrated solar power (CSP) is a solar thermal technology that uses mirrors or lenses to concentrate sunlight into a receiver. The receiver reaches very high temperatures, up to 1000 °C for commercial solar power towers, favouring high power conversion efficiency. However, electricity production is limited by the heat engine used.

In the Concentrated Solar Power sector, using supercritical CO_{2} as the heating engine fluid can provide a significant cost reduction. The higher efficiency of the power block reduces the solar field size, decreasing the soil occupation and therefore the cost of this part of the plant. According to the available analyses, electricity production costs of conventional supercritical CO_{2} CSP are expected to be 9,5–$10 cent/KWh in favorable conditions. In addition, Concentrated Solar Power offers the possibility of directly recovering solar radiation without using any intermediate energy carrier. However, this poses challenges in the design of high pressure solar receivers, that must held pressures above the critical pressure of the fluid, as well as energy storage systems.

Efficient supercritical CO_{2} power cycles requires that the compressor inlet temperature is close to, or even lower than, the critical temperature of the fluid (31 °C for pure carbon dioxide). When this target is reached, and the heat source is higher than 600–650 °C, then the sCO_{2} cycle outperforms any Rankine cycle running on water/steam with the same boundary conditions.

Because of the weather conditions in arid sites where Concentrated Solar Power plants are usually located, with ambient temperatures above 35 °C, it is impossible to cool down CO_{2} enough to compress the fluid with low energy requirements. Accordingly, the rapid transition to an almost ideal behavior of carbon dioxide when temperature increases to 40 °C or above increases compression work and reduces the thermal efficiency of the power block, which can only be increased again through a large increase of turbine inlet temperature. To overcome these thermodynamic problems, a supercritical CO_{2} blend with a higher critical temperature could be employed. The critical temperature of several sCO_{2} blends has been studied. For example, a mixture that reaches a critical temperature of 80 °C can provide high efficiency for heat sink temperatures up to 50 °C.

Properties of different sCO_{2} blends.
Dopant fluid (%molar)	Molar weight (g/mol)	Critical temperature (°C)	Critical pressure (bar)
C_{6}F_{6} (10)	58.21	80.28	112.4
C_{6}F_{6} (15)	65.32	102.1	121.3
C_{6}F_{6} (20)	72.42	121.9	123.6
TiCl_{4} (15)	65.86	93.76	190.9
TiCl_{4} (20)	73.15	149.6	243.7

SCARABEUS project, which has received funding from the European Union, formulates a new conceptual approach to implement supercritical carbon dioxide blends in Concentrated Solar Power Plants to reduce operating and capital costs by increasing the power cycle efficiency. The SCARABEUS project is developed by a consortium of European universities (Politecnico di Milano and Università degli Studi di Brescia from Italy, Technische Universität Wien from Austria, Universidad de Sevilla from Spain and University of London from United Kingdom) and private companies(Kelvion from Germany, Baker Hughes from United States and Abengoa from Spain) with experience in Concentrated Solar Power.

== See also ==
Supercritical carbon dioxide

Concentrated solar power

Electricity generation

Thermodynamic cycle

Rankine cycle

Steam turbine

Carbon dioxide
