= Likens-Nickerson Apparatus =

Piece of laboratory glassware

The Likens-Nickerson apparatus is a piece of laboratory glassware devised by Sam T. Likens and Gail B. Nickerson for the detection of hop oil constituents in 1964. The apparatus performs a simultaneous steam distillation and extraction. The apparatus is typically constructed of borosilicate glass with the cold finger condenser and boiling flasks fitted with ground glass joints. It is typically used to isolate target organic compounds for further quantitative and or qualitative analysis using instrumental chemistry. However, it can also be used to isolate target compound(s) from an aqueous solution as a way of recovering valuable material.

== Description and operation ==
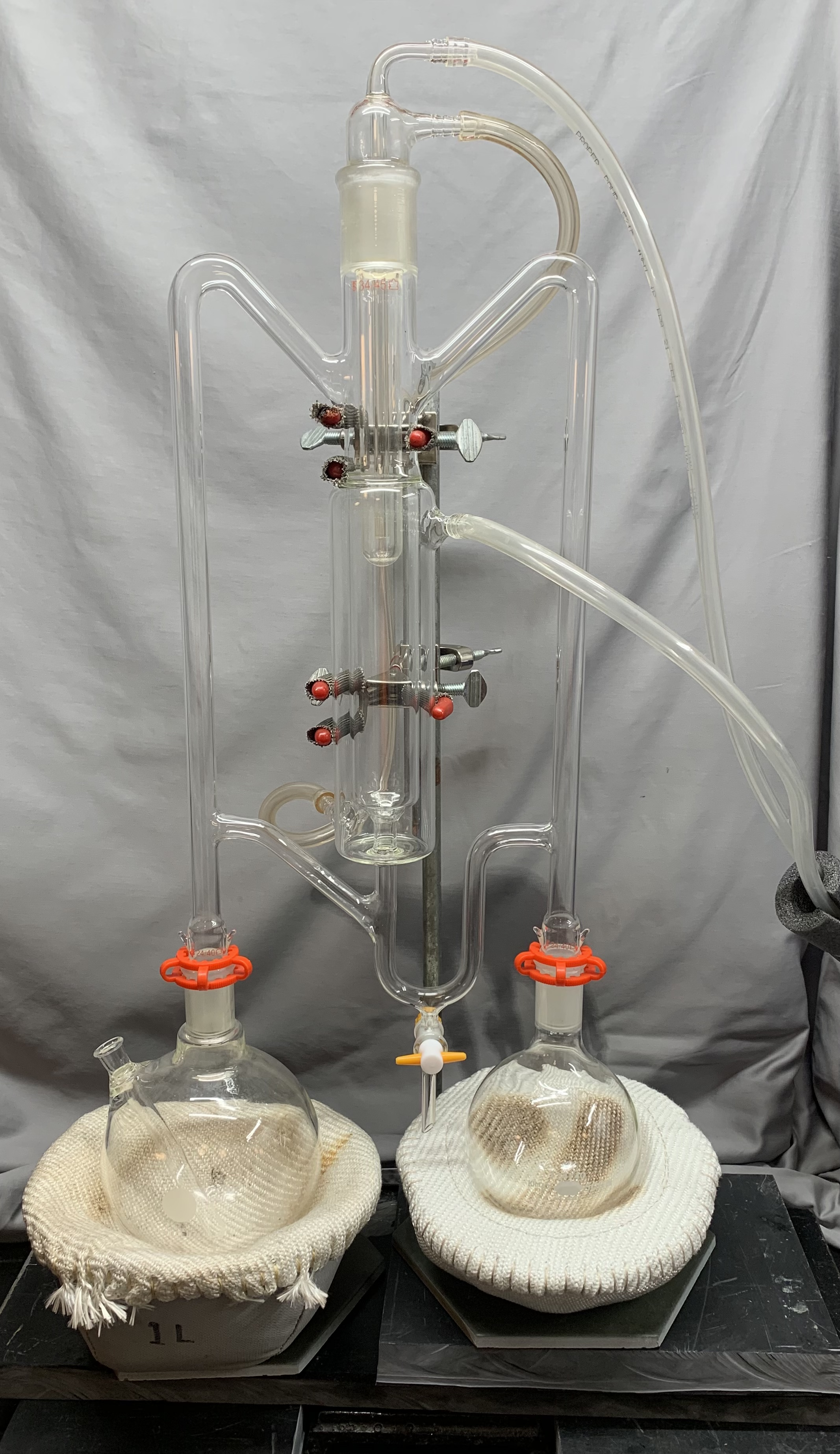
A Likens-Nickerson apparatus with a PTFE stopcock and water-jacket condenser in addition to the cold finger condenser. A round-bottom boiling flask with ground glass joints are affixed to either side of the apparatus with Keck clips.

The unusually shaped Likens-Nickerson apparatus uses two boiling flasks. One flask is loaded with an aqueous solution containing the desired compound(s) and the other with immiscible organic solvent. Each flask is allowed to reach their respective boiling points thus sending their vapors (or aerosolized oils) along the arms of the apparatus to the central cold finger condenser where they emulsify, condense, and fall into a separatory trap that may or may not have a stopcock. The arms of the trap leading back to the original vapor path can be configured in such a way as to return either the aqueous or organic layer to its respective flask.

== History ==
Since its invention in 1964 the apparatus has been adopted, modified, and used by hundreds of researchers for the purposes of analyzing compounds in everything from fermented camels milk to turbot. Perhaps the most notable permutation of the Likens-Nickerson apparatus is the device described by Godefroot et al. in 1981. However, researchers have constructed and used countless variations that allow the apparatus to operate under a vacuum, be filled with inert gas, or be continuously operated. Yet they all acknowledge the Likens-Nickerson apparatus as having informed their respective design.
