= Supercritical carbon dioxide =

Carbon dioxide above its critical point

Carbon dioxide pressure-temperature phase diagram

This video shows the property of carbon dioxide to go into a supercritical state with increasing temperature

Supercritical carbon dioxide (sCO_{2}) is a fluid state of carbon dioxide where it is held at or above its critical temperature and critical pressure.

Carbon dioxide usually behaves as a gas in air at standard temperature and pressure (STP), or as a solid called dry ice when cooled and/or pressurised sufficiently. If the temperature and pressure are both increased from STP to be at or above the critical point for carbon dioxide, it can adopt properties midway between a gas and a liquid. More specifically, it behaves as a supercritical fluid above its critical temperature (304.128 K, 30.9780 °C, 87.7604 °F) and critical pressure (7.3773 MPa, 72.808 atm, 1,070.0 psi, 73.773 bar), expanding to fill its container like a gas but with a density like that of a liquid.

Supercritical CO_{2} is becoming an important commercial and industrial solvent due to its role in chemical extraction, in addition to its relatively low toxicity and environmental impact. The relatively low temperature of the process and the stability of CO_{2} also allows compounds to be extracted with little damage or denaturing. In addition, the solubility of many extracted compounds in CO_{2} varies with pressure, permitting selective extractions.

== Applications ==
=== Solvent ===
Carbon dioxide is gaining popularity among coffee manufacturers looking to move away from classic decaffeinating solvents. sCO_{2} is forced through green coffee beans which are then sprayed with water at high pressure to remove the caffeine. The caffeine can then be isolated for resale (e.g., to pharmaceutical or beverage manufacturers) by passing the water through activated charcoal filters or by distillation, crystallization or reverse osmosis. Supercritical carbon dioxide is used to remove organochloride pesticides and metals from agricultural crops without adulterating the desired constituents from plant matter in the herbal supplement industry.

Supercritical carbon dioxide can be used as a solvent in dry cleaning.

Supercritical carbon dioxide is used as the extraction solvent for creation of essential oils and other herbal distillates. Its main advantages over solvents such as hexane and acetone in this process are that it is non-flammable and does not leave toxic residue. Furthermore, separation of the reaction components from the starting material is much simpler than with traditional organic solvents. The CO_{2} can evaporate into the air or be recycled by condensation into a recovery vessel. Its advantage over steam distillation is that it operates at a lower temperature, which can separate the plant waxes from the oils.

In laboratories, sCO_{2} is used as an extraction solvent, for example for determining total recoverable hydrocarbons from soils, sediments, fly-ash, and other media, and determination of polycyclic aromatic hydrocarbons in soil and solid wastes. Supercritical fluid extraction has been used in determining hydrocarbon components in water.

Processes that use sCO_{2} to produce micro and nano scale particles, often for pharmaceutical uses, are under development. The gas antisolvent process, rapid expansion of supercritical solutions, and supercritical antisolvent precipitation (as well as several related methods) process a variety of substances into particles.

Due to its ability to selectively dissolve organic compounds and assist enzyme functioning, sCO_{2} has been suggested as a potential solvent to support biological activity on Venus- or super-Earth-type planets.

=== Manufactured products ===
Environmentally beneficial, low-cost substitutes for rigid thermoplastic and fired ceramic are made using sCO_{2} as a chemical reagent. The sCO_{2} in these processes is reacted with the alkaline components of fully hardened hydraulic cement or gypsum plaster to form various carbonates. The primary byproduct is water.

sCO_{2} is used in the foaming of polymers. Supercritical carbon dioxide can saturate the polymer with solvent. Upon depressurization and heating, the carbon dioxide rapidly expands, causing voids within the polymer matrix, i.e., creating a foam. Research is ongoing on microcellular foams.

An electrochemical carboxylation of a para-isobutylbenzyl chloride to ibuprofen is promoted under sCO_{2}.

=== Working fluid ===
sCO_{2} is chemically stable, reliable, low-cost, non-flammable and readily available, making it a desirable candidate working fluid for transcritical cycles.

Supercritical CO_{2} is used as the working fluid in domestic water heat pumps. Manufactured and widely used, heat pumps are available for domestic and business heating and cooling. While some of the more common domestic water heat pumps remove heat from the space in which they are located, such as a basement or garage, CO_{2} heat pump water heaters are typically located outside, where they remove heat from the outside air.

sCO_{2} has also been considered as a working fluid for enhanced geothermal systems due to its aqueous and gas properties. sCO_{2} is also favorable for enhanced geothermal due to its high buoyancy, large expansivity and low viscosity.

=== Power generation ===
The unique properties of sCO_{2} present advantages for closed-loop power generation and can be applied to power generation applications. Power generation systems that use traditional air Brayton and steam Rankine cycles can use sCO_{2} to increase efficiency and power output.

The relatively new Allam power cycle uses sCO_{2} as the working fluid in combination with fuel and pure oxygen. The CO_{2} produced by combustion mixes with the sCO_{2} working fluid. A corresponding amount of pure CO_{2} must be removed from the process (for industrial use or sequestration). This process reduces atmospheric emissions to zero.

sCO_{2} promises substantial efficiency improvements. Due to its high fluid density, sCO_{2} enables compact and efficient turbomachinery. It can use simpler, single casing body designs while steam turbines require multiple turbine stages and associated casings, as well as additional inlet and outlet piping. The high density allows more compact, microchannel-based heat exchanger technology.

For concentrated solar power, carbon dioxide critical temperature is not high enough to obtain the maximum energy conversion efficiency. Solar thermal plants are usually located in arid areas, so it is impossible to cool down the heat sink to sub-critical temperatures. Therefore, supercritical carbon dioxide blends, with higher critical temperatures, are in development to improve concentrated solar power electricity production.

Further, due to its superior thermal stability and non-flammability, direct heat exchange from high temperature sources is possible, permitting higher working fluid temperatures and therefore higher cycle efficiency. Unlike two-phase flow, the single-phase nature of sCO_{2} eliminates the necessity of a heat input for phase change that is required for the water to steam conversion, thereby also eliminating associated thermal fatigue and corrosion.

The use of sCO_{2} presents corrosion engineering, material selection and design issues. Materials in power generation components must display resistance to damage caused by high-temperature, oxidation and creep. Candidate materials that meet these property and performance goals include incumbent alloys in power generation, such as nickel-based superalloys for turbomachinery components and austenitic stainless steels for piping. Components within sCO_{2} Brayton loops suffer from corrosion and erosion, specifically erosion in turbomachinery and recuperative heat exchanger components and intergranular corrosion and pitting in the piping.

Testing has been conducted on candidate Ni-based alloys, austenitic steels, ferritic steels and ceramics for corrosion resistance in sCO_{2} cycles. The interest in these materials derive from their formation of protective surface oxide layers in the presence of carbon dioxide, however in most cases further evaluation of the reaction mechanics and corrosion/erosion kinetics and mechanisms is required, as none of the materials meet the necessary goals.

In 2016, General Electric announced a sCO_{2}-based turbine that enabled a 50% efficiency of converting heat energy to electrical energy. In it the CO_{2} is heated to 700 °C. It requires less compression and allows heat transfer. It reaches full power in 2 minutes, whereas steam turbines need at least 30 minutes. The prototype generated 10 MW and is approximately 10% the size of a comparable steam turbine. The 10 MW US$155-million Supercritical Transformational Electric Power (STEP) pilot plant was completed in 2023 in San Antonio. It is the size of a desk and can power around 10,000 homes.

In 2025, The Nuclear Power Institute of China (NPIC) of the China National Nuclear Corporation (CNNC) and its partners have commissioned the world's first commercial supercritical CO_{2} system - Chaotan One - with a capacity of 2 x 15 MW, utilizing waste heat from a steel factory in Liupanshui, Guizhou Province.

=== Impregnation ===
Due to its low viscosity while retaining solvent capacities, supercritical carbon dioxide is also used for impregnation of different raw materials. The biggest industrial application in this field is impregnation of wood with biocides. The big advantage is, that the CO_{2} can penetrate the complete structure of the board, carrying the active ingredient and therefore fully impregnating it.

=== Aerogel production ===
Supercritical carbon dioxide is used in the production of silica, carbon and metal based aerogels. For example, silicon dioxide gel is formed and then exposed to sCO_{2}. When the CO_{2} goes supercritical, all surface tension is removed, allowing the liquid to leave the aerogel and produce nanometer sized pores.

=== Cleaning ===
Supercritical CO_{2} is used in the cleaning process for certain types of microelectronics. The low viscosity and high solvency of scCO_{2} is appropriate for small and delicate parts found in microelectronics. This method works by putting the component into a pressure vessel that is cycled with scCO_{2}.

Natural cork is a suberin based natural polymer foam that can have unpleasant substances which are responsible for cork taint. The leading substance is 2,4,6 trichloroanisole (TCA), which can be detected at concentrations as low as 2 ng/l in the wine. Supercritical CO_{2} is used at industrial scale to remove this substance and guarantee that the wine retains its full quality.

Supercritical CO_{2} is an alternative for thermal sterilization of biological materials and medical devices with combination of the additive peracetic acid (PAA). Supercritical CO_{2} does not sterilize the media, because it does not kill the spores of microorganisms. Moreover, this process is gentle, as the morphology, ultrastructure and protein profiles of inactivated microbes are preserved.

=== Geothermal energy ===
Supercritical CO_{2} can be used as a working fluid for geothermal electricity generation in both enhanced geothermal systems and sedimentary geothermal systems (so-called CO_{2} Plume Geothermal). EGS systems utilize an artificially fractured reservoir in basement rock while CPG systems utilize shallower naturally-permeable sedimentary reservoirs. Possible advantages of using CO_{2} in a geologic reservoir, compared to water, include higher energy yield resulting from its lower viscosity, better chemical interaction, and permanent CO_{2} storage as the reservoir must be filled with large masses of CO_{2}. As of 2011, the concept had not been tested in the field.

== See also ==
- Caffeine
- Dry cleaning
- Perfume
- Supercritical fluid
- Atmosphere of Venus, nearly all carbon dioxide, supercritical at the surface
