= Ash (chemistry) =

Process prior to a chemical analysis

In analytical chemistry, ashing or ash content determination is the process of mineralization by complete combustion for preconcentration of trace substances prior to a chemical analysis, such as chromatography, or optical analysis, such as spectroscopy.

== Overview ==
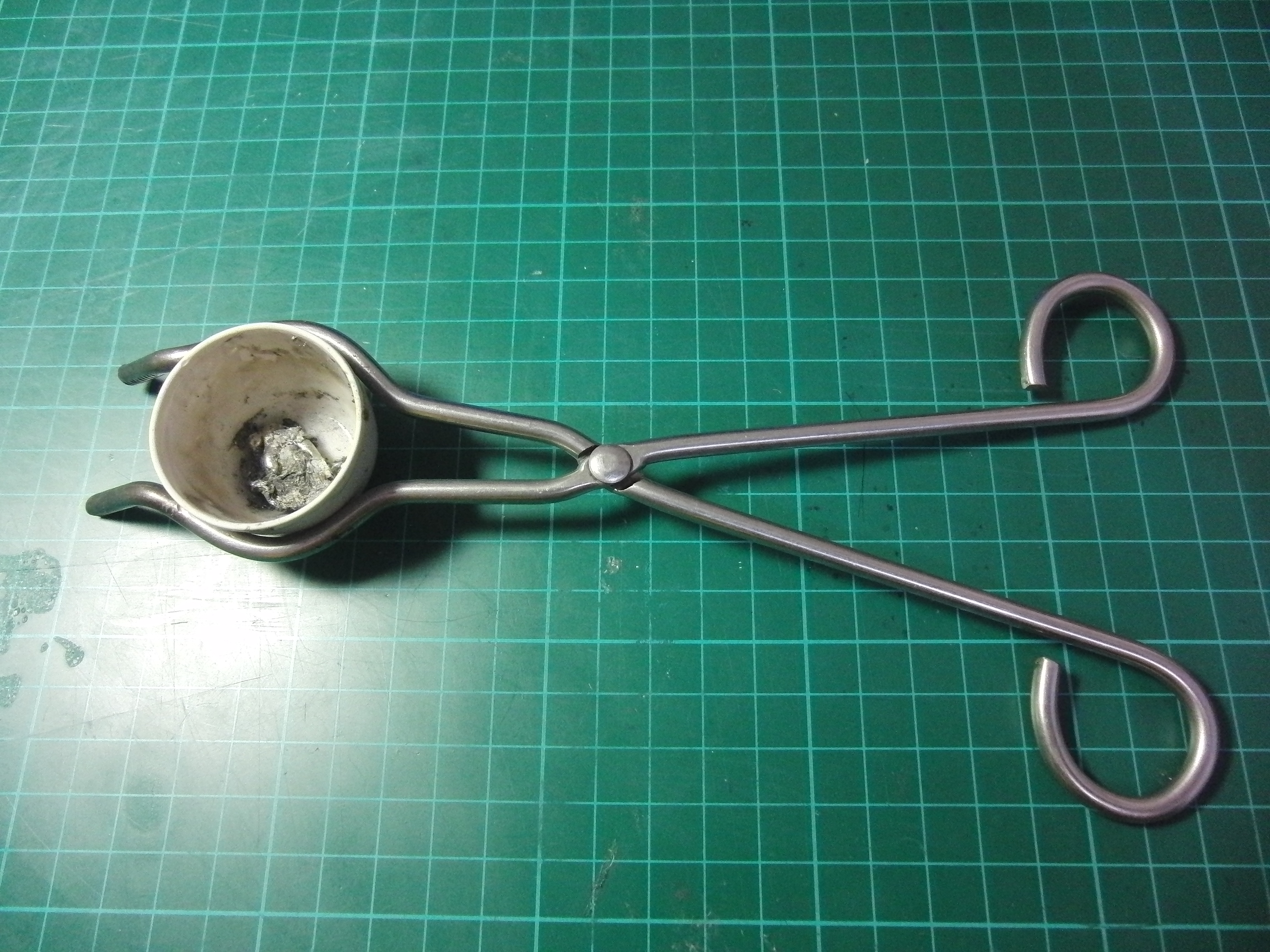
A crucible and tongs, on a green mat.

The ash content of a sample is a measure of the amount of inorganic noncombustible material it contains. The residues after a sample is completely burnt - in contrast to the ash remaining after incomplete combustion - typically consist of oxides of the inorganic elements present in the original sample. Ash is one of the components in the proximate analysis of biological materials, consisting mainly of salty, inorganic constituents. It includes metal salts which are important for processes requiring ions such as Na^{+} (sodium), K^{+} (potassium), and Ca^{2+} (calcium). It also includes trace minerals which are required for unique molecules, such as chlorophyll and hemoglobin.

Procedures for ash content determination are similar to procedures for loss on ignition. Typically, the term ash is used for primarily organic material such as fuels and foodstuffs, while the term loss on ignition is used for primarily inorganic material such as rocks and combusted ash.

A crucible can be used to determine the percentage of ash contained in a sample of material such as coal, wood, oil, rubber, plastics, foodstuffs, or any burnable material. The appropriate method for ash determination varies depending upon the type of sample analyzed. Each method may vary in parameters such as furnace temperature, residence time in the furnace, number of heating steps, and sample preparation procedures.

The ISO mandates ash content determination for most foodstuffs. Examples include

- ISO 2171: Cereals, pulses and by-products — Determination of ash yield by incineration;
- ISO 3593: Starch — Determination of ash;
- ISO 928: Spices and condiments - Determination of total ash; and
- ISO 936: Meat and meat products - Determination of total ash.

Examples of ash content methods for the determination of ash in other solids include

- ASTM D482: Standard Test Method for Ash from Petroleum Products;
- ISO 6245: Petroleum products — Determination of ash;
- ASTM D874: Standard Test Method for Sulfated Ash from Lubricating Oils and Additives;
- ASTM D3174: Standard Test Method for Ash in the Analysis Sample of Coal and Coke from Coal;
- ISO 1171: Solid mineral fuels — Determination of ash;
- ISO 18122: Solid biofuels — Determination of ash content;
- ASTM D1102: Standard Test Method for Ash in Wood;
- ASTM D2974: Standard Test Methods for Determining the Water (Moisture) Content, Ash Content, and Organic Material of Peat and Other Organic Soils;
- ASTM D2866: Standard Test Method for Total Ash Content of Activated Carbon;
- ISO 3451: Plastics — Determination of ash — Part 1: General methods;
- ASTM D2584: Standard Test Method for Ignition Loss of Cured Reinforced Resins; and
- ASTM D5630: Standard Test Method for Ash Content in Plastics.

== Fuels and consumption ==
Ashing is a test to deduce the amount of ash forming material present in a petroleum product so as to decide its use in certain applications. Ash-forming materials are considered to be undesirable impurities or contaminants.

In the ash analysis of petroleum products, ash content represents the incombustible component remaining after a sample of the furnace oil is completely burned. The ash content of petroleum products is generally low. It is defined as the inorganic residue that remains after combustion of the oil in air at specific high temperature. Ash typically ranges from 0.1 to 0.2% in oil. Some of the ash forming constituents occur naturally in crude oil; others are present as a result of refining or contamination during storage or distribution. Knowledge of the amount of ash-forming material present in a product can provide information as to whether or not the product is suitable application.

In the ash analysis of coal and other solid fuels, the amount of sulfur retained in the ash during the ashing process is not constant, but rather is dependent upon the conditions of ashing as well as the other inorganic constituents in the ash that may form sulfates during the ashing procedure. As such, different ashing procedures may yield different ash contents.

== Measurement ==
=== Apparatus ===
Some necessary apparatus include:

- crucible (or similar porcelain or metal dishes)
- muffled furnace
- hot plate
- the sample

=== Procedure ===
A crucible and its lid are pre-weighed after thorough drying. The sample is added to the completely dry crucible and lid and together they are weighed to determine the mass of the sample by difference. The sample is placed in the hot furnace long enough so that complete combustion of the sample occurs. The crucible, lid and ash then are re-weighed.

=== Analysis ===
The analysis of honey shows:

Typical honey analysis

- Fructose: 38%
- Glucose: 31%
- Sucrose: 1%
- Water: 17%
- Other sugars: 9% (maltose, melezitose)
- Ash: 0.17%

In this example the ash would include all the minerals in honey.

Ashing is also performed prior to chemical analysis by inductively coupled plasma emission spectrometry.

== See also ==
- Oxides, e.g., Al_{2}O_{3}, CaO, Fe_{2}O_{3}, MgO, MnO, P_{2}O_{5}, K_{2}O, SiO_{2}
- Carbonates: Na_{2}CO_{3} (soda ash), K_{2}CO_{3} (potash)
- Bicarbonates, e.g., NaHCO_{3} (baking soda)
- Sulfates: sulfate ash, according to Ph. Eur.
- Inductively coupled plasma emission spectrometry
- Atomic absorption spectroscopy
