= Steam distillation =

Method of separation in organic chemistry

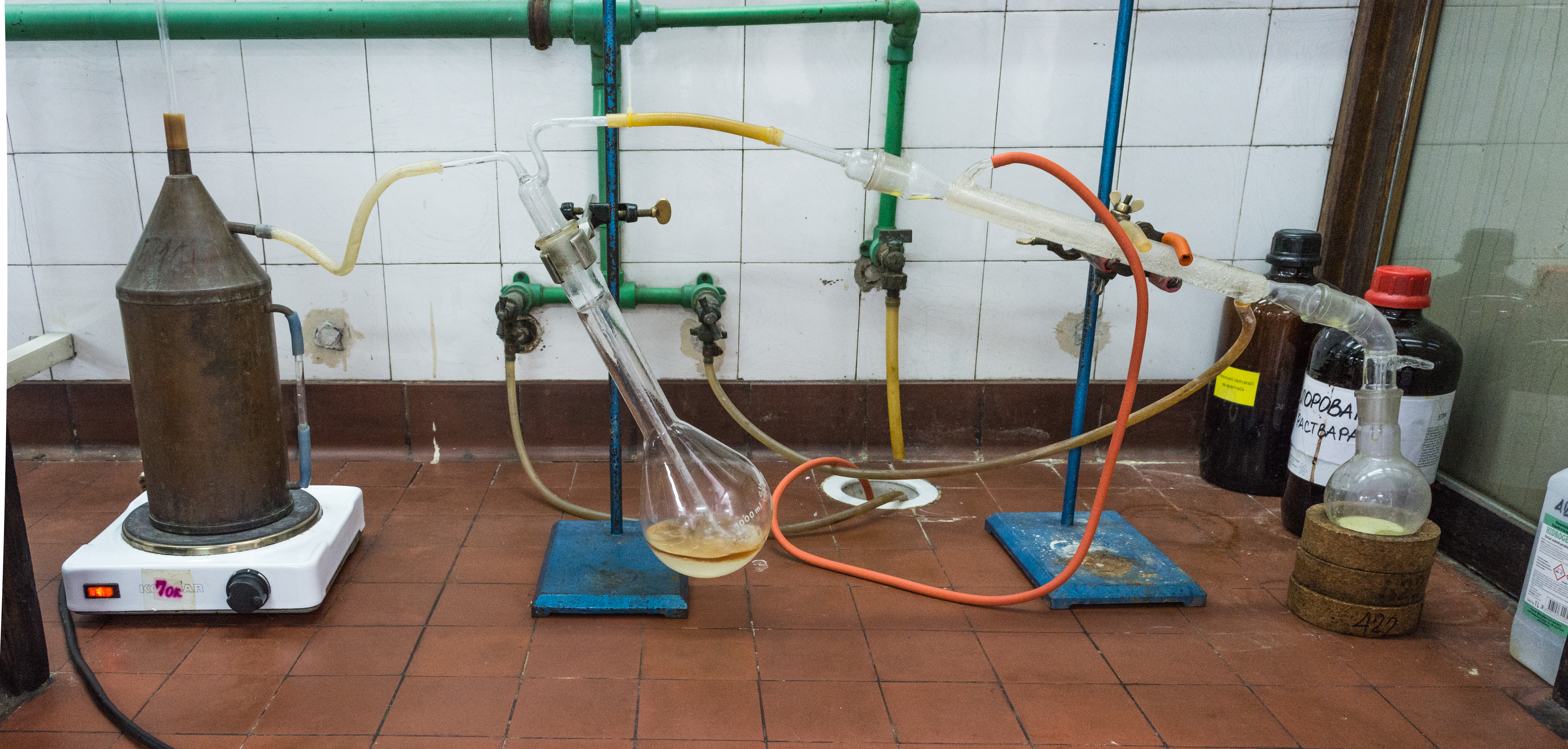
Steam distillation apparatus, showing aniline steam distillation

Steam distillation is a separation process that consists of distilling water together with other volatile and non-volatile components. The steam from the boiling water carries the vapor of the volatiles to a condenser; both are cooled and return to the liquid or solid state, while the non-volatile residues remain behind in the boiling container.

If, as is usually the case, the volatiles are not miscible with water, they will spontaneously form a distinct phase after condensation, allowing them to be separated by decantation or with a separatory funnel.

Steam distillation can be used when the boiling point of the substance to be extracted is higher than that of water, and the starting material cannot be heated to that temperature because of decomposition or other unwanted reactions. It may also be useful when the amount of the desired substance is small compared to that of the non-volatile residues. It is often used to separate volatile essential oils from plant material. for example, to extract limonene (boiling point 176 °C) from orange peels.

Steam distillation once was a popular laboratory method for purification of organic compounds, but it has been replaced in many such uses by vacuum distillation and supercritical fluid extraction. It is however much simpler and economical than those alternatives, and remains important in certain industrial sectors.

In the simplest form, water distillation or hydrodistillation, the water is mixed with the starting material in the boiling container. In direct steam distillation, the starting material is suspended above the water in the boiling flask, supported by a metal mesh or perforated screen. In dry steam distillation, the steam from a boiler is forced to flow through the starting material in a separate container. The latter variant allows the steam to be heated above the boiling point of water (thus becoming superheated steam), for more efficient extraction.

== History ==
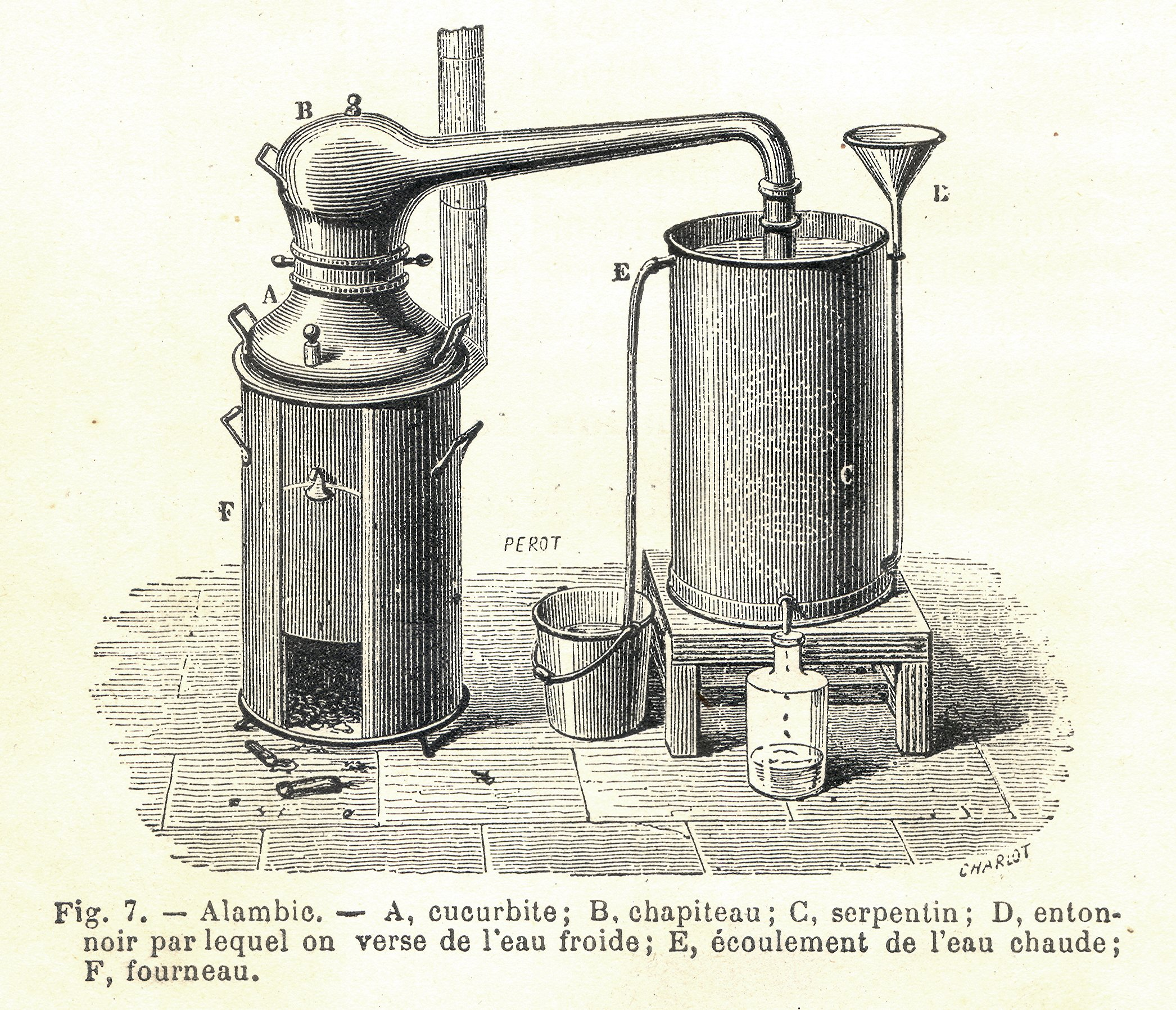
Steam distillation apparatus

Steam distillation is used in many of the recipes given in the Kitāb al-Taraffuq fī al-ʿiṭr ('Book of Gentleness on Perfume'), also known as the Kitāb Kīmiyāʾ al-ʿiṭr wa-l-taṣʿīdāt ('Book of the Chemistry of Perfume and Distillations'), attributed to the early Arabic philosopher al-Kindi (c. 801–873). Steam distillation was also used by the Persian philosopher and physician Avicenna (980–1037) to produce essential oils by adding water to rose petals and distilling the mixture. The process was also used by al-Dimashqi (1256–1327) to produce rose water on a large scale.

== Principle ==
Every substance has some vapor pressure even below its boiling point, so in theory it could be distilled at any temperature by collecting and condensing its vapors. However, ordinary distillation below the boiling point is not practical because a layer of vapor-rich air would form over the liquid, and evaporation would stop as soon as the partial pressure of the vapor in that layer reached the vapor pressure. The vapor would then flow to the condenser only by diffusion, which is an extremely slow process.

Simple distillation is generally done by boiling the starting material, because, once its vapor pressure exceeds atmospheric pressure, that still vapor-rich layer of air will be disrupted, and there will be a significant and steady flow of vapor from the boiling flask to the condenser.

In steam distillation, that positive flow is provided by steam from boiling water, rather than by the boiling of the substances of interest. The steam carries with it the vapors of the latter.

The substance of interest does not need to be miscible water or soluble in it. It suffices that it has significant vapor pressure at the steam's temperature.

If the water forms an azeotrope with the substances of interest, the boiling point of the mixture may be lower than the boiling point of water. For example, bromobenzene boils at 156 °C (at normal atmospheric pressure), but a mixture with water boils at 95 °C. However, the formation of an azeotrope is not necessary for steam distillation to work.

== Applications ==
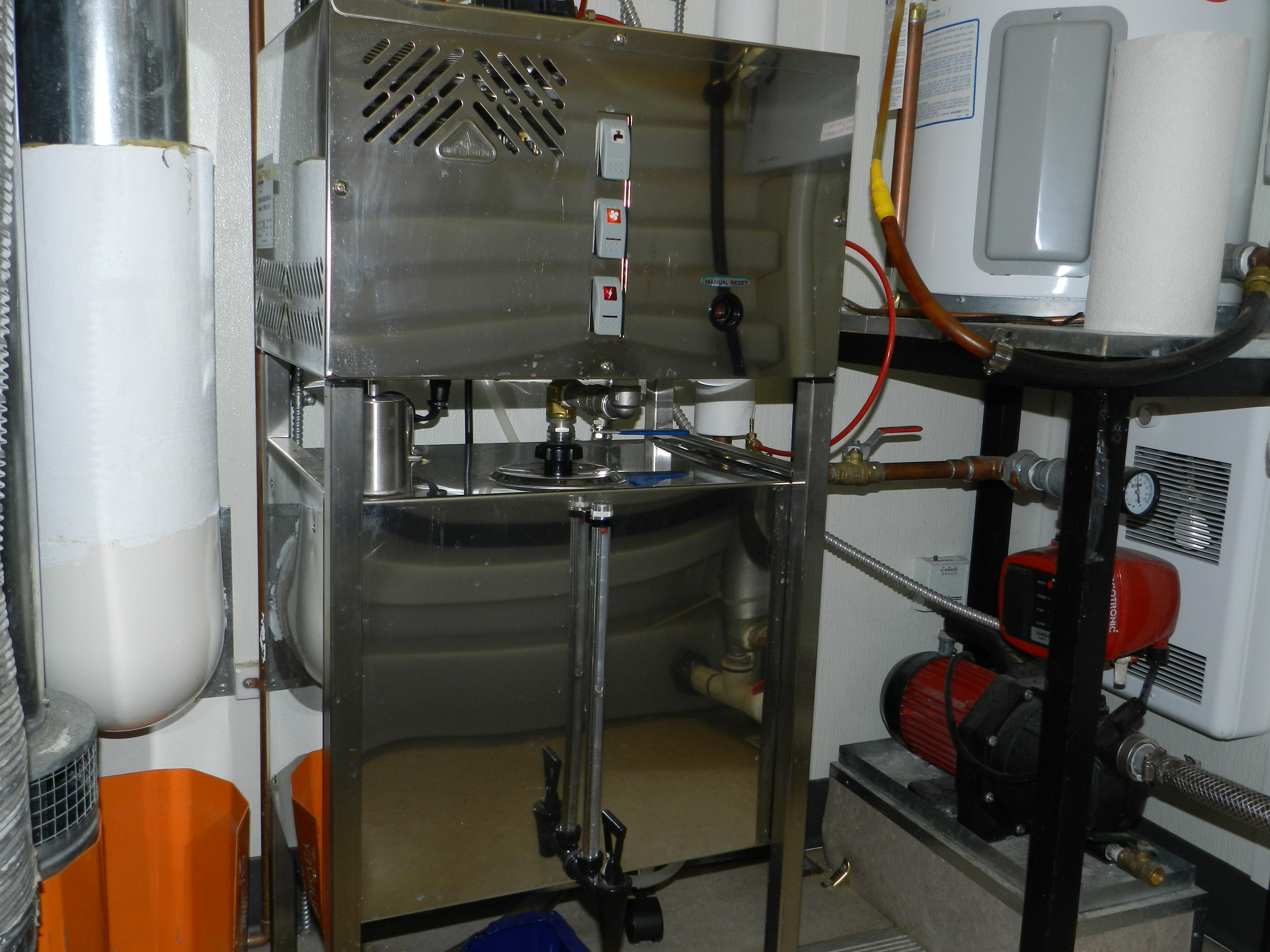
A boiling water distiller. Boiling tank on top and holding tank on the bottom.

Steam distillation is often employed in the isolation of essential oils, for use in perfumes, for example. In this method, steam is passed through the plant material containing the desired oils. Eucalyptus oil and camphor oil are obtained by this method on an industrial scale. Steam distillation is a means of purifying fatty acids, e.g. from tall oils. The main challenge to steam distillation is that the conditions are vigorous (100 °C, hours), which can result in degradation of the targeted compound(s). Extraction with supercritical carbon dioxide is a gentler alternative albeit capital intensive.

== Laboratory techniques ==
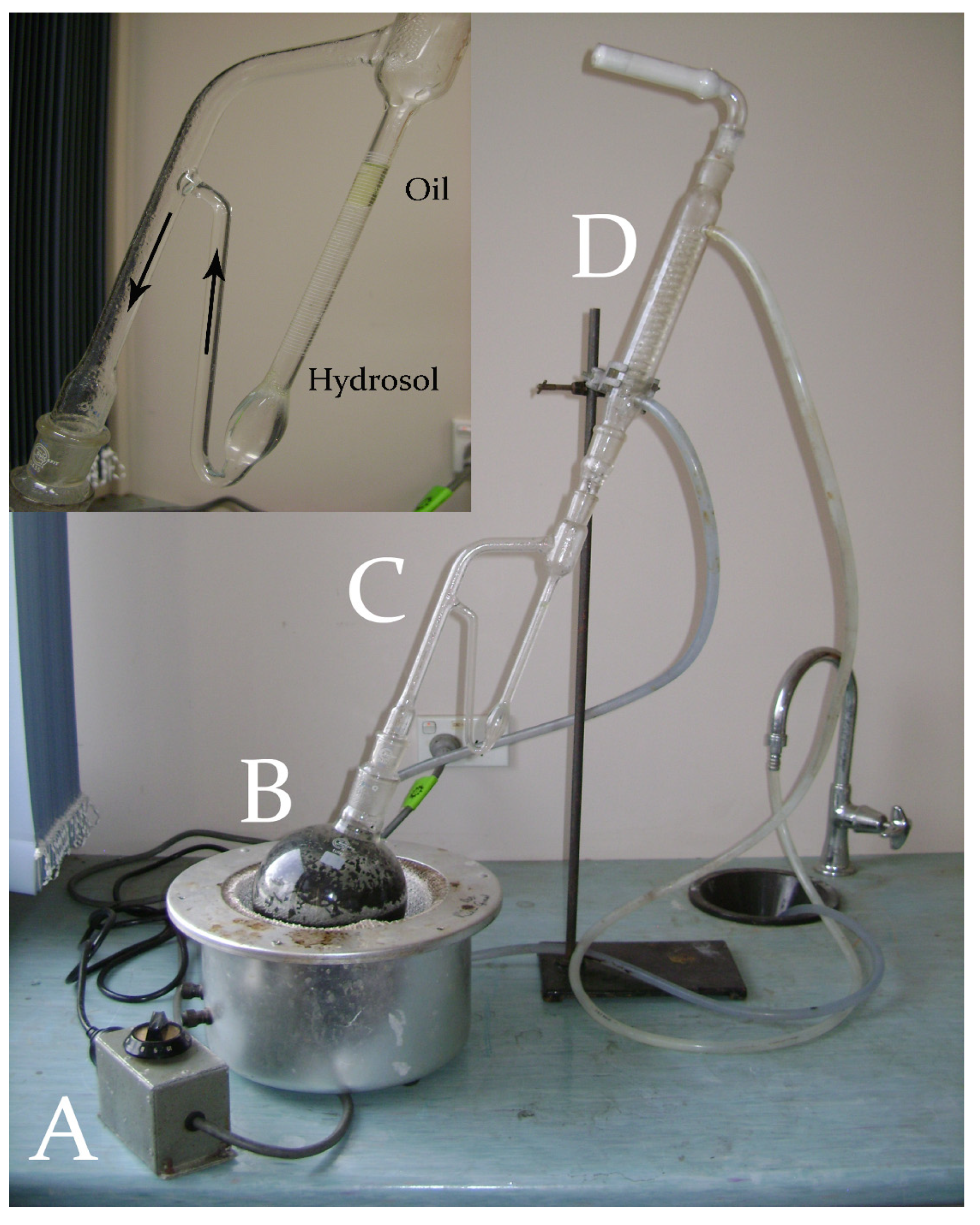
Hydrodistillation using the Steam distillation apparatus, Clevenger-type apparatus. (A) Power regulator; (B) Heating mantle with round bottom flask containing water and aromatic leaves; (C) Clevenger-type apparatus that returns the hydrosol to the still and maintains the essential oil phase, but only for essential oils that are less dense than water and therefore float; (D) The condenser.

On a lab scale, steam distillations are carried out using steam generated outside the system and piped through the mixture to be purified. Steam can also be generated in-situ using a Clevenger-type apparatus.

The Likens-Nickerson apparatus simultaneously performs steam distillation and extraction. It is typically used to isolate target organic compounds for further analysis.

Uses of steam distillation in the chemical laboratory are illustrated by several standardized protocols. Steam distillation is used in the purification of bromobiphenyl. In one preparation of benzophenone, steam is employed to first recover unreacted carbon tetrachloride and subsequently to hydrolyze the intermediate benzophenone dichloride into benzophenone, which is in fact not steam distilled. In one preparation of a purine, steam distillation is used to remove volatile benzaldehyde from nonvolatile product.

== See also ==
- Azeotropic distillation
- Batch distillation
- Distillation
- Extractive distillation
- Fractional distillation
- Heteroazeotrope
- Herbal distillates
- Hydrodistillation
- Laboratory equipment
- Steam engine
- Steam stripping
- Supercritical fluid extraction
- Theoretical plate
