= Jännersdorf Solar Park =

Photovoltaic power station in Germany

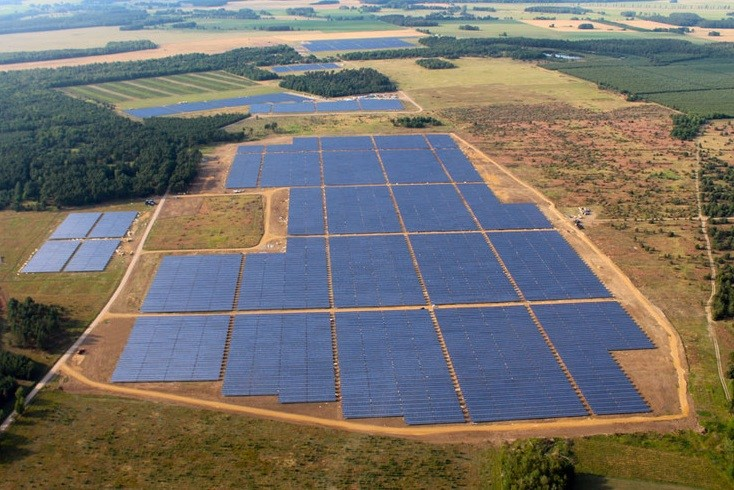
- Country: Germany
- Location: Prignitz
- Coordinates: 53°21′N 12°03′E
- Commission date: 30 June 2012

Solar farm
- Type: Flat-panel PV
- Site area: 90 ha (222 acres)

Power generation
- Units operational: 167,550
- Nameplate capacity: 40.5 MW_{p}
- Annual net output: 38 GWh

The Jännersdorf Solar Park is a photovoltaic power station in Prignitz, Germany. It has a capacity of 40.5 megawatts (MW) and an annual output of 38 GWh. The solar park was developed and built by Parabel AG.

== Description ==
The project is built on a former military training area on 90 hectares (220 acres). The project is equipped with 167,550 photovoltaic modules, with 25.6 MW from Trina Solar, 9.6 MW from Suntech Power and 5.3 MW from Hareon. The solar park was connected to the grid on 30 June 2012.
