= Herbal distillate =

Aqueous product of the hydrodistillation of volatile organic substances

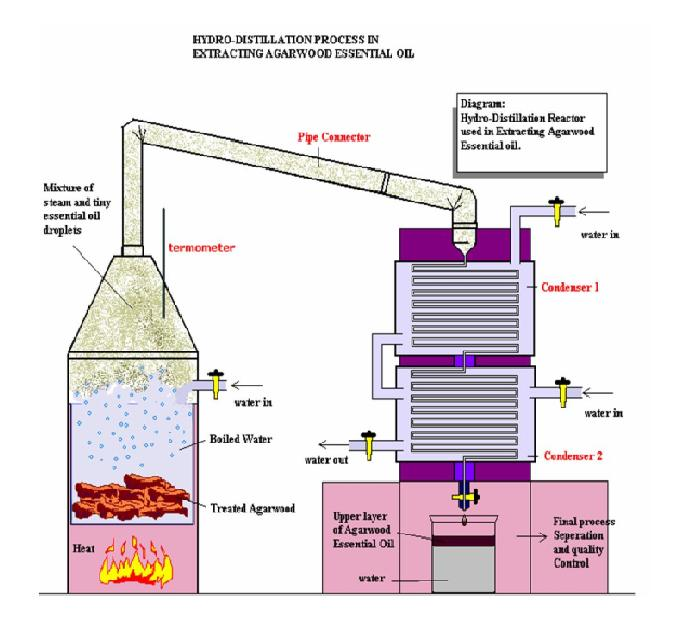
Hydro-distillation process of agarwood essential oil.

Herbal distillates, also known as floral waters, flower waters, hydrosols, hydrolates, herbal waters, and essential waters, are aqueous products of hydrodistillation. They are colloidal suspensions of essential oils as well as water-soluble components obtained by steam distillation or hydrodistillation (a variant of steam distillation) from plants and herbs. These herbal distillates have uses as flavorings and cosmetics. Common herbal distillates for skincare include rose water, orange flower water, and witch hazel. Rosemary, oregano, and thyme are hydrosols that may be used in food manufacturing industries.

== Production ==
Herbal distillates are produced in the same or similar manner as essential oils. However, essential oils will float to the top of the distillate where it can be removed, leaving behind the watery distillate. For this reason, the term essential water is an apt description. In the past, these essential waters were often considered a byproduct of distillation, but are now considered an important co-product. The produced herbal waters are essentially diluted essential oils at less than 1% concentration (typically 0.02% to 0.05%). Several factors, such as temperature and a herb's growth cycle, impact the characteristics of a distillate, and therefore influence the timing of the distillation. Rosemary, for example, should be distilled in the peak of summer before it flowers.

== Usage ==
Herbal distillates are often used in culinary applications to add flavors to foods and beverages. Commonly used distillates in this context include rose water, orange blossom water, and peppermint hydrosol.

Herbal distillates can be used to preserve food, or even as insecticides. In the cosmetics industry, herbal distillates are used in skin and hair care products, and as preservatives.

Agriculturally, herbal distillates can be used as pesticides. Additionally, herbal distillates may be used in allelopathy, with possible applications including the manipulation of the timing of sprouting or germination.

== Science ==
The science of distillation is based on the fact that different substances evaporate at different temperatures. Unlike other extraction techniques based on solubility of a compound in either water or oil, distillation separates components regardless of their solubility. The plant material is distilled with water, in a form of steam distillation where the non-boiling plant essential oil is carried over by steam from boiling water, and is then condensed. Compounds with a higher vaporization point remain behind, and include water-soluble plant pigments and flavonoids.

Because hydrosols are produced at high temperatures and are somewhat acidic, they tend to inhibit bacterial growth but not fungal growth. They are not sterile, and should be kept refrigerated to preserve freshness. Herbal distillates degrade over time and will degrade faster than essential oils, which are more stable. Small-scale producers of hydrosols must be particularly aware of the risk of bacterial contamination and take steps to prevent it. Despite concerns that there may be significant amounts of heavy metals in some herbal distillates, this has not shown to be the case.

== See also ==
- Orange flower water
- Rose water
- Witch hazel (astringent)

== Books ==
- Firth, Grace. Secrets of the Still. Epm Pubns Inc; First edition (June 1983)
- Price, Len and Price, Shirley. Understanding Hydrolats: The Specific Hydrosols for Aromatherapy: A Guide for Health Professional. Churchill Livingstone 2004
- Rose, Jeanne. 375 Essential Oils & Hydrosols. Frog, Ltd, Berkeley, CA, 1999. ISBN 1-883319-89-7
- Rose, Jeanne. Hydrosols & Aromatic Waters. Institute of Aromatic & Herbal Study, 2007.
