= Proximate =

Proximates are used in the analysis of biological materials as a decomposition of a human-consumable good into its major constituents. They are a good approximation of the contents of packaged comestible goods and serve as a cost-effective and easy verification of nutritional panels. This means that testing can be used to verify lots, but cannot be used to validate a food processor or food processing facility; instead, a nutritional assay must be conducted on the product to qualify said producers. Nutritional panels in the United States are regulated by the FDA and must undergo rigorous testing to ensure the exact and precise content of nutrients. This should prevent food processors from making unfounded claims to the public.

== Usage ==
In industry, the standard proximates are:

- Moisture content
- Volatile matter
- Ash content
- Fixed carbon
- Carbohydrates (calculated)

Analytically, four of the five constituents are obtained via chemical reactions and experiments. The fifth constituent, carbohydrates, are calculated based on the determination of the four others. Proximates should nearly always account for 100% of a food product; any deviation from 100% displays the resolution of the chemical test, as small variations in the way each test is performed accumulate or overlap the compositional make-up.

Additional ingredients may fall under the category of one of the five constituents. Carbohydrates, for example, include but are not limited to dietary fibers, sugars, and sugar alcohol. Ash includes dietary minerals such as sodium, potassium, iron and calcium.
