= Steam–electric power station =

Power station whose electric generator is steam-driven

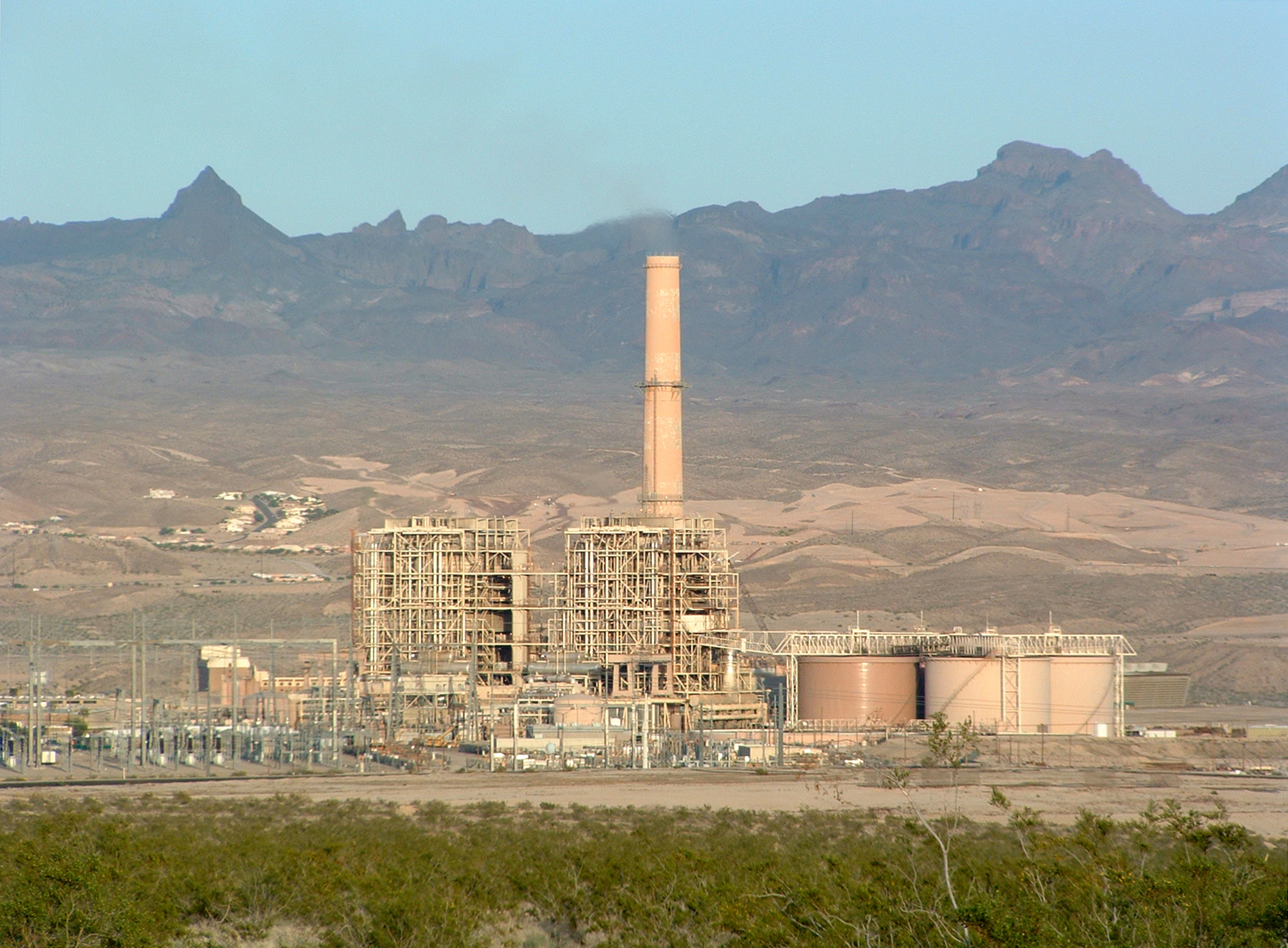
Mohave Generating Station, a 1,580 MW steam–electric power plant near Laughlin, Nevada fuelled by coal

A steam–electric power station is a power station in which the electric generator is steam-driven: water is heated, evaporates, and spins a steam turbine which drives an electric generator. After it passes through the turbine, the steam is condensed in a condenser. The greatest variation in the design of steam–electric power plants is due to the different fuel sources.

Almost all coal, nuclear, geothermal, solar thermal electric power plants, waste incineration plants as well as many natural gas power plants are steam–electric. Natural gas is frequently combusted in gas turbines as well as boilers. The waste heat from a gas turbine can be used to raise steam, in a combined cycle plant that improves overall efficiency.

Worldwide, most electric power is produced by steam–electric power plants. The only widely used alternatives are photovoltaics, direct mechanical power conversion as found in hydroelectric and wind turbine power as well as some more exotic applications like tidal power or wave power and finally some forms of geothermal power plants. Niche applications for methods like betavoltaics or chemical power conversion (including electrochemistry) are only of relevance in batteries and atomic batteries. Fuel cells are a proposed alternative for a future hydrogen economy.

== History ==
Reciprocating steam engines have been used for mechanical power sources since the 18th Century, with notable improvements being made by James Watt. The very first commercial central electrical generating stations in New York and London, in 1882, also used reciprocating steam engines. As generator sizes increased, eventually turbines took over due to higher efficiency and lower cost of construction. By the 1920s any central station larger than a few thousand kilowatts would use a turbine prime mover.

== Efficiency ==
The efficiency of a conventional steam–electric power plant, defined as energy produced by the plant divided by the heating value of the fuel consumed by it, is typically 33 to 48%, limited as all heat engines are by the laws of thermodynamics (See: Carnot cycle). The rest of the energy must leave the plant in the form of heat. This waste heat can be removed by cooling water or in cooling towers. (cogeneration uses the waste heat for district heating). An important class of steam power plants is associated with desalination facilities, which are typically found in desert countries with large supplies of natural gas. In these plants freshwater and electricity are equally important products.

Since the efficiency of the plant is fundamentally limited by the ratio of the absolute temperatures of the steam at turbine input and output, efficiency improvements require use of higher temperature, and therefore higher pressure, steam. Historically, other working fluids such as mercury have been experimentally used in a mercury vapour turbine power plant, since these can attain higher temperatures than water at lower working pressures. However, poor heat transfer properties and the obvious hazard of toxicity have ruled out mercury as a working fluid.

Another option is using a supercritical fluid as a working fluid. Supercritical fluids behave similar to gases in some respects and similar to liquids in others. Supercritical water or supercritical carbon dioxide can be heated to much higher temperatures than are achieved in conventional steam cycles thus allowing for higher thermal efficiency. However, these substances need to be kept at high pressures (above the critical pressure) to maintain supercriticality and there are issues with corrosion.

== Components Of Steam plant ==
=== Condenser ===
Diagram of a typical water-cooled surface condenser

Steam–electric power plants use a surface condenser cooled by water circulating through tubes. The steam which was used to turn the turbine is exhausted into the condenser and is condensed as it comes in contact with the tubes full of cool circulating water. The condensed steam, commonly referred to as condensate. is withdrawn from the bottom of the condenser. The adjacent image is a diagram of a typical surface condenser.

For best efficiency, the temperature in the condenser must be kept as low as practical in order to achieve the lowest possible pressure in the condensing steam. Since the condenser temperature can almost always be kept significantly below 100 °C where the vapor pressure of water is much less than atmospheric pressure, the condenser generally works under vacuum. Thus leaks of non-condensable air into the closed loop must be prevented. Plants operating in hot climates may have to reduce output if their source of condenser cooling water becomes warmer; unfortunately this usually coincides with periods of high electrical demand for air conditioning. If a good source of cooling water is not available, cooling towers may be used to reject waste heat to the atmosphere. A large river or lake can also be used as a heat sink for cooling the condensers; temperature rises in naturally occurring waters may have undesirable ecological effects, but may also incidentally improve yields of fish in some circumstances.

=== Feedwater heater ===
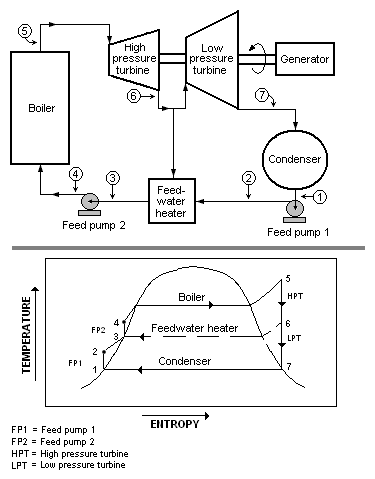
A Rankine cycle with a two-stage steam turbine and a single feedwater heater.

In the case of a conventional steam–electric power plant using a drum boiler, the surface condenser removes the latent heat of vaporization from the steam as it changes states from vapor to liquid. The condensate pump then pumps the condensate water through a feedwater heater, which raises the temperature of the water by using extraction steam from various stages of the turbine.

Preheating the feedwater reduces the irreversibilities involved in steam generation and therefore improves the thermodynamic efficiency of the system. This reduces plant operating costs and also helps to avoid thermal shock to the boiler metal when the feedwater is introduced back into the steam cycle.

=== Boiler ===
Once this water is inside the boiler or steam generator, the process of adding the latent heat of vaporization begins. The boiler transfers energy to the water by the chemical reaction of burning some type of fuel. The water enters the boiler through a section in the convection pass called the economizer. From the economizer, it passes to the steam drum, from where it goes down the downcomers to the lower inlet water wall headers. From the inlet headers, the water rises through the waterwalls. Some of it is turned into steam due to the heat being generated by the burners located on the front and rear waterwalls (typically). From the waterwalls, the water/steam mixture enters the steam drum and passes through a series of steam and water separators and then dryers inside the steam drum. The steam separators and dryers remove water droplets from the steam; liquid water carried over into the turbine can produce destructive erosion of the turbine blades. and the cycle through the waterwalls is repeated. This process is known as natural circulation.

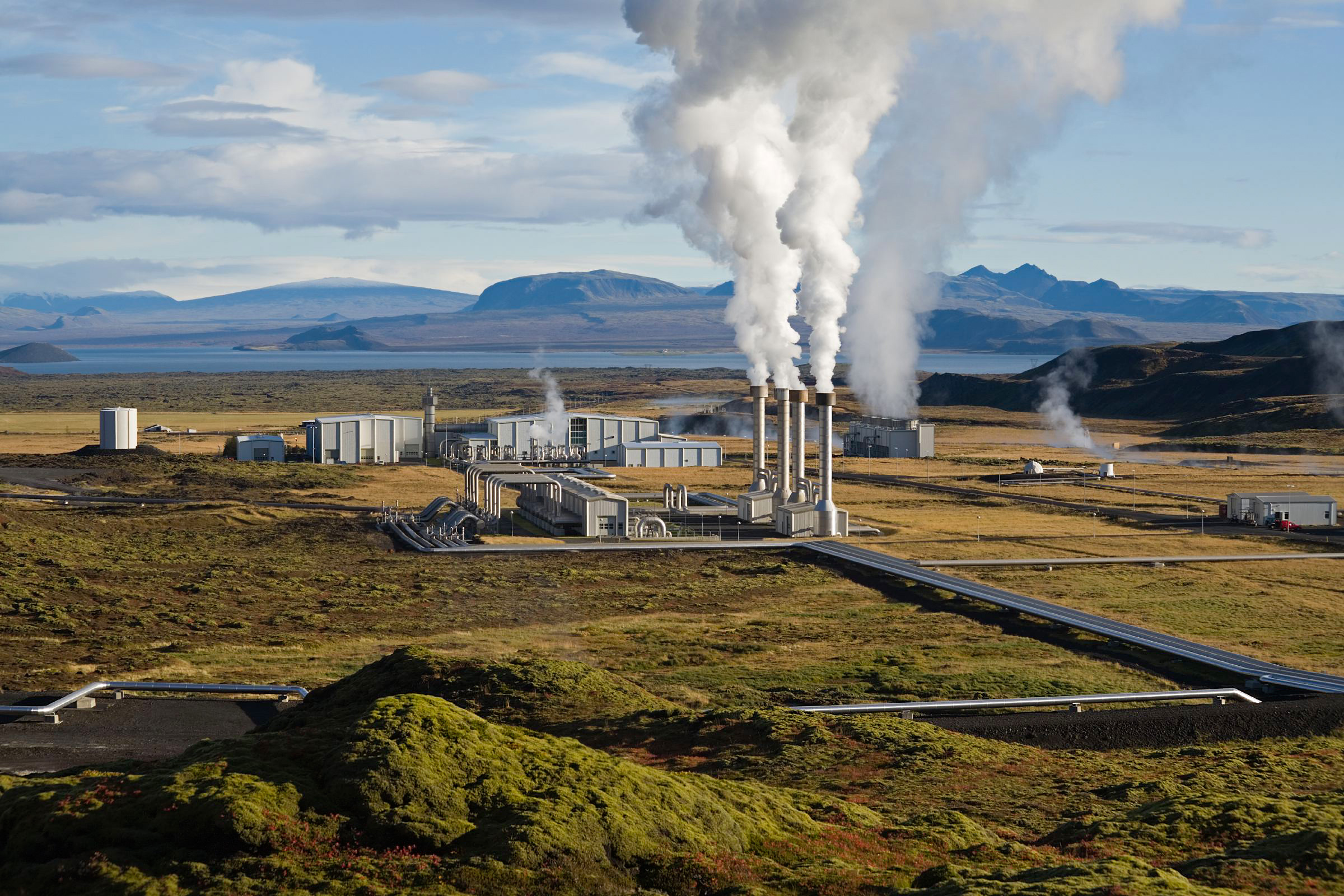
Geothermal power station in Iceland

Geothermal plants need no boiler since they use naturally occurring steam sources. Heat exchangers may be used where the geothermal steam is very corrosive or contains excessive suspended solids. Nuclear plants also boil water to raise steam, either directly passing the working steam through the reactor or else using an intermediate heat exchanger.

=== Superheater ===
After the steam is conditioned by the drying equipment inside the drum, it is piped from the upper drum area into an elaborate set up of tubing in different areas of the boiler, the areas known as superheater and reheater. The steam vapor picks up energy and is superheated above the saturation temperature. The superheated steam is then piped through the main steam lines to the valves of the high-pressure turbine.

== See also ==
- Boiler
- Combined heat and power
- Cooling tower system
- Flue gas stacks
- Fossil fuel power plant
- Geothermal power
- Nuclear power plant
- Power station
- Thermal power station
- Water-tube boiler
