= Hygroscopic cycle =

Thermodynamic cycle converting thermal energy into mechanical power

The Hygroscopic cycle is a thermodynamic cycle converting thermal energy into mechanical power by the means of a steam turbine. It is similar to the Rankine cycle using water as the motive fluid but with the novelty of introducing salts and their hygroscopic properties for the condensation. The salts are desorbed in the boiler or steam generator, where clean steam is released and superheated in order to be expanded and generate power through the steam turbine. Boiler blowdown with the concentrated hygroscopic compounds is used thermally to pre-heat the steam turbine condensate, and as reflux in the steam-absorber.

Condensation is done in a steam absorber, as opposed to the traditional condenser found in the Rankine cycle. Here the outlet steam is absorbed by cooled hygroscopic compounds using the same principles as in absorption refrigerators. These hygroscopic compounds are cooled by an air-cooler, where the heat of condensation is dissipated by an air-cooler. Because of the thermal recovery of the boiler blowdown, the hygroscopic reaction in the steam condenser, and the use of an air-cooler to dissipate the heat of condensation, the efficiency of the cycle is higher, with a higher electrical output, reduces or eliminates the need for cooling water, reduces the operating costs, and the capital cost of the utility power plant.

== Principles ==
The hygroscopic effect of salts is well known and used in Absorption refrigerators where heat is used for refrigeration. In these machines, the refrigerant is absorbed-dissolved into another fluid (a hygroscopic fluid), reducing its partial pressure in the evaporator and allowing more liquid to evaporate. In the hygroscopic cycle, the gas absorbed-dissolved into the other fluid is the steam coming from the outlet of the steam turbine. As the steam is absorbed-dissolved into the hygroscopic fluid, more steam can condense, and the reduction in vapor pressure is equivalent to a reduction in the condensation pressure at the outlet of the steam turbine. The effect of this is that a steam turbine with a lower outlet pressure can be used, with a lower enthalpy level at the outlet of the turbine. This increases the efficiency of the turbine, and generates a higher electrical output.

In the steam absorber, steam is absorbed with a concentrated hygroscopic fluid. As the steam is absorbed, the concentration of the hygroscopic fluid decreases, or the salt is diluted. Hygroscopic / deliquescent fluids with a high dilution capacity in water, such as LiBr usually also show a high saturation temperature / low saturation pressure. In other words, the deliquescent fluid can condense vapor at a higher temperature. This means that the temperature of the concentrated hygroscopic fluid entering the absorber can be higher than a non hygroscopic fluid. As a result, the cooling is easier than in a conventional Rankine cycle in the condensation section by using an air-cooler to dissipate the heat of condensation in the refluxed concentrated hygroscopic fluid mentioned earlier.

With the appropriate salts, this can reduce, or even eliminate the consumption of cooling water in the power plant. Cooling water circuits in power plants consume a high amount of fresh water and chemicals, and their alternative, electric air cooled steam condenser consumes part of the power produced in conventional power plants, reducing the Rankine cycle efficiency.

The air-cooler used in the hygroscopic cycle cools a liquid flow with concentrated hygroscopic compound, with an overall volumetric heat capacity much higher than the steam traditionally condensed in the air cooled condenser mentioned earlier, thus reducing the power needed for ventilation, and needing less surface area for heat exchange and obtaining a lower overall cost of the plant.

Cooling water circuits are also expensive, require numerous equipment, such as pumps and cooling towers, and expensive water treatment. Thus by reducing the cooling water needed, the operating costs of the plant will be reduced.

Depending on the salts chosen, in particular those with a high dilution capacity (i.e. LiBr), saturation temperature of the hygroscopic fluid can be up to 40 °C higher than the steam leaving the turbine.

The salts are concentrated in the boiler, as steam is disengaged from liquid water. Given that the concentration of salts increases, the boiling point temperature of the mixture of salts is affected. In most salts, this will increase the boiling point temperature, and the steam temperature that is disengaged.

== Hygroscopic Fluids ==
Hygroscopic compounds are all those substances that attract water in vapour or liquid from their environment, thus their use as desiccant. Many of them react chemically with water such as hydrates or alkaline metals. Others trap water as water of hydration in their crystalline structure, such as sodium sulfate. For the last two cases, water can be easily desorbed in a reversible way, as opposed to the first case, where water cannot be recovered easily (calcination may be required).

The selection of hygroscopic salts have to provide the following strict criteria in order to be of interest of use in the hygroscopic cycle:

- Highly hygroscopic compounds, deliquescent materials
- Less volatile than water (vapor pressure lower than water), with easily reversible desorption into water and steam in the boiler
- Good solubility in water at low to moderate temperatures
- Non-reactivity with other salts in the cycle and chemically stable over the range of temperatures and pressures in the hygroscopic cycle
- Are non-toxic and non flammable
- Thermal and physical properties are not degraded over cycles

Some of the most known salts with similar properties are Calcium chloride, Sodium Hydroxyde, sulfuric acid and Copper(II) sulfate

== Refinements of Hygroscopic Cycle ==
Other advantages are that most of the optimisations used in actual Rankine cycle can be achieved in this Cycle, such as reheat and regeneration.

== Hygroscopic Cycle Pilot Plant ==
A hygroscopic cycle demonstration plant has been built, demonstrating the concepts of the cycle, which includes the absorption of vapour in an absorber where hygroscopic compounds are recirculated, obtaining condensations with temperatures higher than the saturation temperature. The physical and chemical characteristics of the hygroscopic compounds, as well as their impact on the boiler, and other main equipment of the cycle similar to those found in thermoelectric plants have also been proven, together with the overall thermodynamic efficiency of the cycle.

== Hygroscopic Cycle industrial reference ==
The hygroscopic cycle has been introduced in a biomass power plant in the province of Cordoba, Spain. This is the first industrial reference of this technology. It has a capacity of 12.5 MW and is part of Oleicola el Tejar. The biomass fed is dried olive bones from the olive oil industry surrounding the plant in the south of Cordoba. The plant was being forced to reduce its production due to water restrictions during high temperatures in the region (the plant consumed 1200 m3/day using adiabatic air coolers from 25 °C onwards of ambient temperature). The Hygroscopic cycle has allowed the plant to cut the cooling consumption for these air coolers, increase the power output by 1%, and increase the availability all around the year. The plant can now operate at 38 °C, and even 45 °C ambient temperature. The owner of the plant can now reach all the generation premiums of this plant. This increase also helps the province to reach the COP 21 agreement.

== State of the art ==
The Hygroscopic Cycle is a concept that has evolved recently and is at the heart of intensive research on hygroscopic fluids. Recent developments have been the Kalina cycle, but with the actual configuration, it is expected to have an impact in locations with poor access to water, and a good integration with combined cycle plants, and any thermoelectric plants (CSP, biomass, coal). Here the residual heat of the boiler and hygroscopic fluid leaving the boiler can be used for heating purposes.

The current state of development is being led by Francisco Javier Rubio Serrano, where his research team and company, IMASA INGENIERÍA Y PROYECTOS, S.A. are developing other configurations, and researching hygroscopic fluids for each particular application together with their most suitable construction materials.
