= Ionocaloric refrigeration =

Refrigeration process

The ionocaloric refrigeration cycle is a cooling technology that utilizes the ionocaloric effect, driven by an electrochemical field, to achieve efficient refrigeration. By manipulating the electrochemical potential through ion addition or removal, significant temperature changes and entropy variations are achieved. This cycle is distinct from typical widespread refrigeration cycles.

It was developed by Drew Lilley and Ravi Prasher at the Department of Energy's Lawrence Berkeley National Laboratory with their work published in January 2023.

== Overview ==
The ionocaloric refrigeration cycle is a cooling technology that offers high efficiency and zero global warming potential. This cycle utilizes the ionocaloric effect, which is driven by an electrochemical field, to achieve significant adiabatic temperature changes and isothermal entropy changes. Developed as a solution to the pressing need for sustainable and environmentally-friendly refrigeration systems, the ionocaloric refrigeration cycle shows promising results in terms of performance and energy efficiency.

Traditional refrigeration technologies, such as vapor-compression (VC) systems, have relied on hydrofluorocarbons (HFCs) as refrigerants. However, HFCs have a high global warming potential and contribute significantly to greenhouse gas emissions. To address these environmental concerns, researchers have explored solid-state caloric materials that exhibit refrigeration effects under external fields. While previous caloric materials have shown limited performance and low coefficient of performance (COP), the ionocaloric cycle demonstrates remarkable improvements.

The ionocaloric effect operates by manipulating the electrochemical field surrounding a solid phase through the addition or removal of ions. This electrochemical mixing of species induces significant energetic changes, resulting in a thermal response and temperature variation within the system. Unlike other caloric effects, where the applied field interacts with the material's conjugate field pair, the ionocaloric effect operates in reverse. The control of the electrochemical potential is achieved by altering the concentration of chemical species through various field variables such as temperature, pressure, and voltage.

The ionocaloric refrigeration cycle incorporates the ionocaloric effect into a thermodynamic cycle to provide continuous and efficient refrigeration. The cycle involves four steps: isentropic mixing, isocompositional and isothermal melting via heat absorption, isentropic separation, and isocompositional and isothermal crystallization via heat rejection. By following these steps, the cycle achieves Carnot-like behavior and enables efficient cooling.

Among various ionocaloric systems, the ethylene carbonate-sodium iodide system has shown particular promise. It exhibits high latent heat of fusion, a melting point above room temperature, and environmental compatibility, making it an attractive option for practical applications. The ionocaloric effect in this system surpasses other caloric effects reported to date, demonstrating significantly higher adiabatic temperature changes and entropy changes per unit mass and volume.

The practical implementation of the ionocaloric refrigeration cycle involves the use of desalination techniques, such as electrodialysis, to separate the solution and regenerate the system. While the theoretical properties of the EC/NaI system show competitive performance, real-world efficiency will depend on the details of the separation process. Electrochemical techniques like electrodialysis offer high efficiencies without requiring high operating pressures or fields, making them suitable for practical application.

Ideal ionocaloric materials require substantial enthalpy of fusion, elevated cryoscopic constant, and large dielectric constant, indicative of high salt solubility. The ethylene carbonate-sodium iodide system is a promising candidate for experimentation. While salts like 𝑍𝑛𝐶𝑙_{2} and 𝐻𝑔𝐶𝑙_{2} have high solubilities, their passage through cation exchange membranes is impeded, and they risk producing toxic chlorine gas. Conversely, 𝑁𝑎𝐼 and 𝐾𝐼, with high solubilities and ionic conductivity, are suitable for ionocaloric devices, NaI being preferred for superior salt solubility.

== Principle of operation ==
The ionocaloric heat pump is a solid-liquid based heat pumping technology with high efficiencies over very-high temperature spans. It utilizes the ionocaloric effect by changing the concentration of a salt in a mixture to modulate a material's melting point, and therefore heat content. The ionocaloric effect is defined as a thermal response to an applied electrochemical field (i.e. ionic field). Ionocaloric heating/cooling utilizes the ionocaloric effect within an appropriate thermodynamic cycle (e.g. Reverse Carnot or Stirling cycle).

Ionocaloric cooling works by surrounding a solid phase with ions (i.e. applying an electrochemical field to the solid), which makes the solid more stable as a liquid . To transition to a liquid, it must melt, which means it must absorb energy. If melted adiabatically (and therefore isenthalpically), it will increase its energy so that it can become a liquid by stealing energy from itself, which cools the whole material down. Once the material is cooled down, the solid can continue melting, but at a now lower temperature, thus absorbing energy from its surroundings (i.e. refrigeration).

Ionocaloric heating works in reverse. By removing the ions from a liquid, the liquid -- if chosen carefully -- becomes more stable as a solid. To transition to its solid phase, it must crystallize and release energy. If crystallized adiabatically, it will heat itself up (i.e., “recalescence”). Once the material is heated up, it will continue releasing energy by crystallizing, but now releasing heat to the environment (i.e. heat pumping).

By stepping through these four processes, a Carnot-like heat pump cycle emerges with zero global warming potential. The first demonstrated prototype was published in Science in 2022, and is CO_{2}-negative, environmentally benign, non-hazardous, zero-GWP, non-toxic, and non-flammable.

== Advantages ==
Ionocaloric refrigeration has several advantages over traditional refrigeration technologies.

- It does not require any harmful refrigerants, such as chlorofluorocarbons (CFCs) or hydrofluorocarbons (HFCs), which are known to contribute to global warming and ozone depletion.
- Has the potential to offer high energy efficiency, which can lead to significant cost savings and reduced environmental impact.

== See also ==
- Refrigerant
- Refrigeration
- Refrigeration cycle
- Vapor-compression refrigeration
