= Enthalpy–entropy chart =

Chart describing internal energy of thermodynamic systems

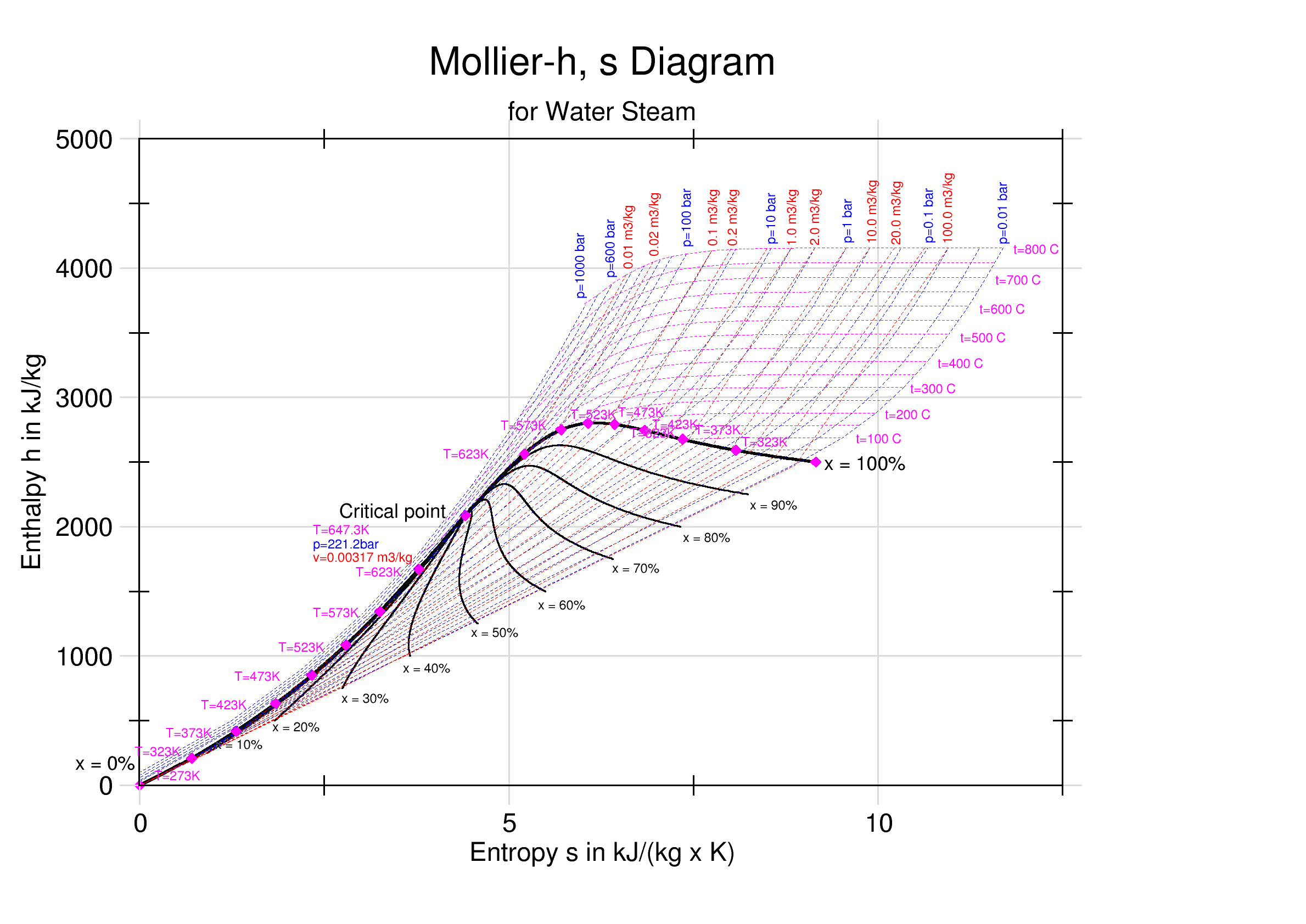
The Mollier enthalpy–entropy diagram for water and steam. The "dryness fraction", x, gives the fraction by mass of gaseous water in the wet region, the remainder being droplets of liquid.

An enthalpy–entropy chart, also known as an H–S chart or Mollier diagram, plots the total heat against entropy, describing the enthalpy of a thermodynamic system. A typical chart covers a pressure range of 0.01–1000 bar, and temperatures up to 800 degrees Celsius. It shows enthalpy $H$ in terms of internal energy $U$, pressure $p$ and volume $V$ using the relationship $H = U + pV \,\!$ (or, in terms of specific enthalpy, specific entropy and specific volume, $h = u + pv \!$ ).

== History ==
The diagram was created in 1904, when Richard Mollier plotted the total heat H against entropy S.

At the 1923 Thermodynamics Conference held in Los Angeles, it was decided to name any thermodynamic diagram using enthalpy as one of its axes a "Mollier diagram" in his honor.

== Details ==
Mollier diagram (chart), I–P units

Mollier diagram (chart), US units

On the diagram, lines of constant pressure, constant temperature and volume are plotted, so in a two-phase region, the lines of constant pressure and temperature coincide. Thus, coordinates on the diagram represent entropy and heat.

The work done in a process on vapor cycles is represented by length of h, so it can be measured directly, whereas in a T–s diagram it has to be computed using thermodynamic relationship between thermodynamic properties.

In an isobaric process, the pressure remains constant, so the heat interaction is the change in enthalpy.

In an isenthalpic process, the enthalpy is constant. A horizontal line in the diagram represents an isenthalpic process.

A vertical line in the h–s chart represents an isentropic process. The process 3–4 in a Rankine cycle is isentropic when the steam turbine is said to be an ideal one. The expansion process in a turbine can therefore be easily calculated using the h–s chart when the process is considered to be ideal, which is the case normally when calculating enthalpies, entropies, etc. (Deviations from the ideal values can later be calculated by considering the isentropic efficiency of the steam turbine used.)

Lines of constant dryness fraction (x), sometimes called the quality, are drawn in the wet region and lines of constant temperature are drawn in the superheated region. X gives the fraction (by mass) of gaseous substance in the wet region, the remainder being colloidal liquid droplets. Above the heavy line, the temperature is above the boiling point, and the dry (superheated) substance is gas only.

In general, h–s charts do not show the values of specific volumes, nor do they show the enthalpies of saturated water at pressures which are of the order of those experienced in condensers in a thermal power station. Hence the chart is only useful for enthalpy changes in the expansion process of the steam cycle.

== Applications and usage ==
It can be used in practical applications such as malting to represent the grain–air–moisture system.

The underlying property data for the Mollier diagram is identical to a psychrometric chart. At first inspection, there may appear little resemblance between the charts, but if the user rotates a chart ninety degrees and then mirrors it, the resemblance is apparent. The Mollier diagram coordinates are enthalpy h and humidity ratio x. The enthalpy coordinate is skewed while the constant enthalpy lines are parallel and evenly spaced.

== Gallery ==
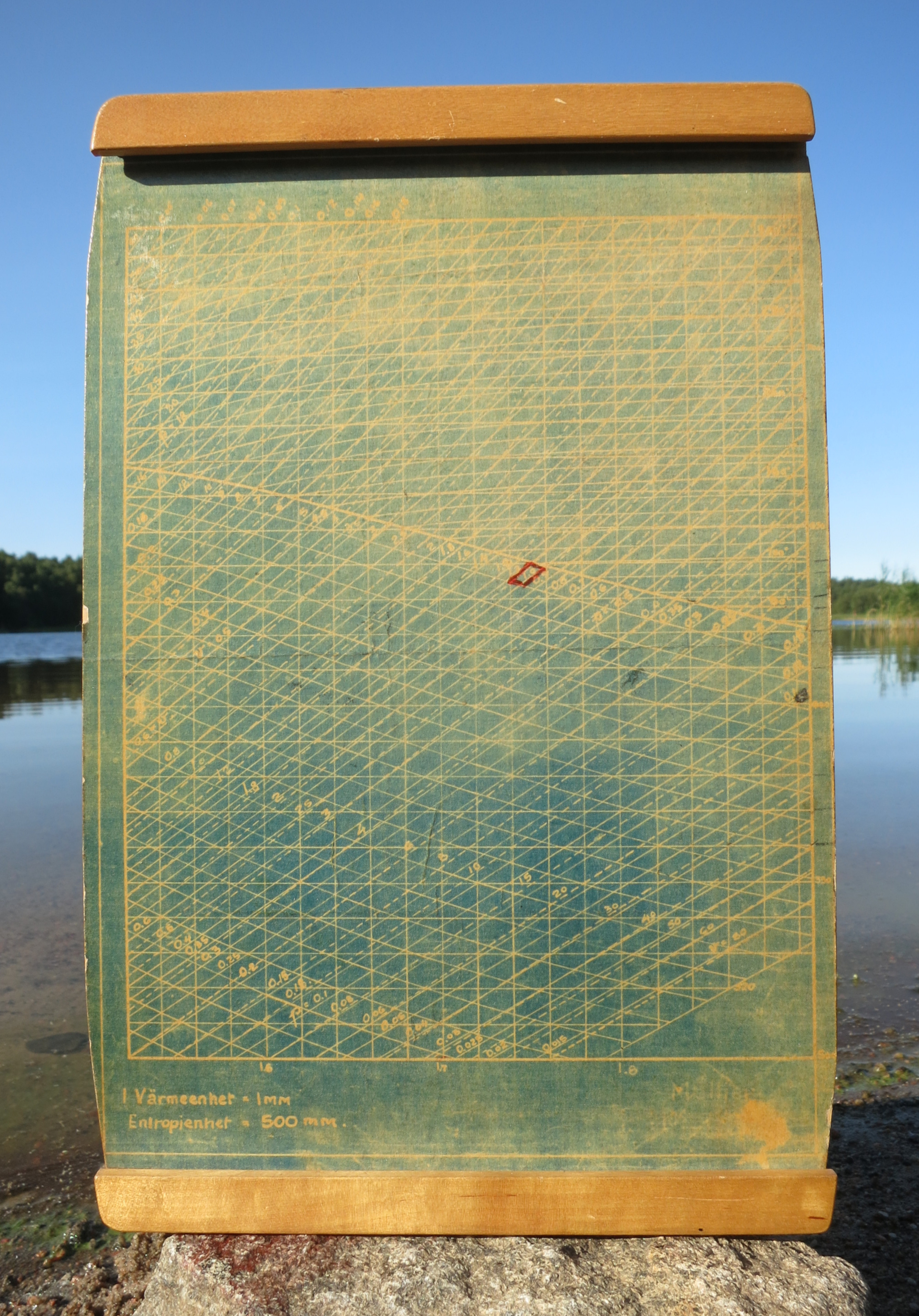
Swedish Mollier diagram from the 1940s

== See also ==
- Thermodynamic diagrams
- Contour line
- Phase diagram
