= Steam =

Water in the gas phase

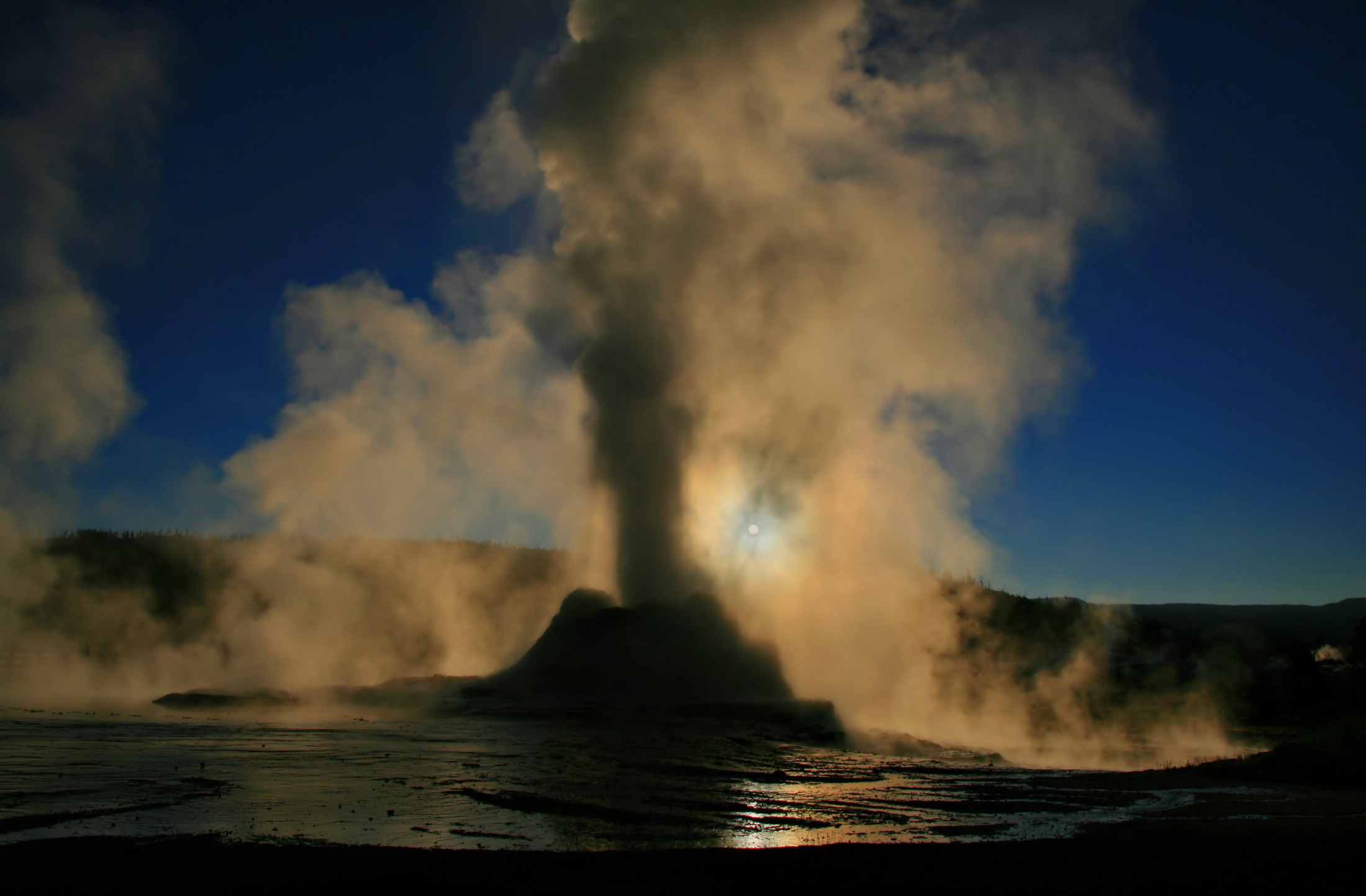
Liquid phase eruption of Castle Geyser in Yellowstone Park

Steam is water vapor, often mixed with air or an aerosol of liquid water droplets. This may occur by evaporation or by boiling, where heat is applied until water reaches the enthalpy of vaporization. Superheated or saturated steam is invisible; however, wet steam, a visible mist or aerosol of water droplets, is often referred to as "steam".

When liquid water becomes steam, it increases in volume by 1,700 times at standard temperature and pressure; this change in volume can be converted into mechanical work by steam engines such as reciprocating piston-type engines and steam turbines. Piston-type steam engines played a central role in the Industrial Revolution, and steam-based generation today produces 80 percent of the world's electricity. If liquid water comes into contact with a very hot surface or depressurizes quickly below its vapor pressure, it can create a steam explosion.

== Types of steam and conversions ==
Steam is traditionally created by heating a boiler by burning coal and other fuels, but it is also possible to create steam with solar energy. Water vapour that includes water droplets is described as "wet steam". As wet steam is heated further, the droplets evaporate, and at a high enough temperature (which depends on the pressure) all of the water evaporates and the system is in vapor–liquid equilibrium. When steam has reached this equilibrium point, it is referred to as "saturated steam".

Superheated steam or live steam is steam at a temperature higher than its boiling point for the pressure, which only occurs when all liquid water has evaporated or has been removed from the system.

Steam tables contain thermodynamic data for water/saturated steam and are often used by engineers and scientists in design and operation of equipment where thermodynamic cycles involving steam are used. Additionally, thermodynamic phase diagrams for water/steam, such as a temperature-entropy diagram or a Mollier diagram may be useful. Steam charts are also used for analysing thermodynamic cycles.

Enthalpy-entropy (h-s) diagram

Pressure-enthalpy (p-h) diagram for steam

Temperature-entropy (T-s) diagram for steam

== Uses ==
=== Agricultural ===
In agriculture, steam is used for soil sterilization to avoid the use of harmful chemical agents and increase soil health.

=== Domestic ===
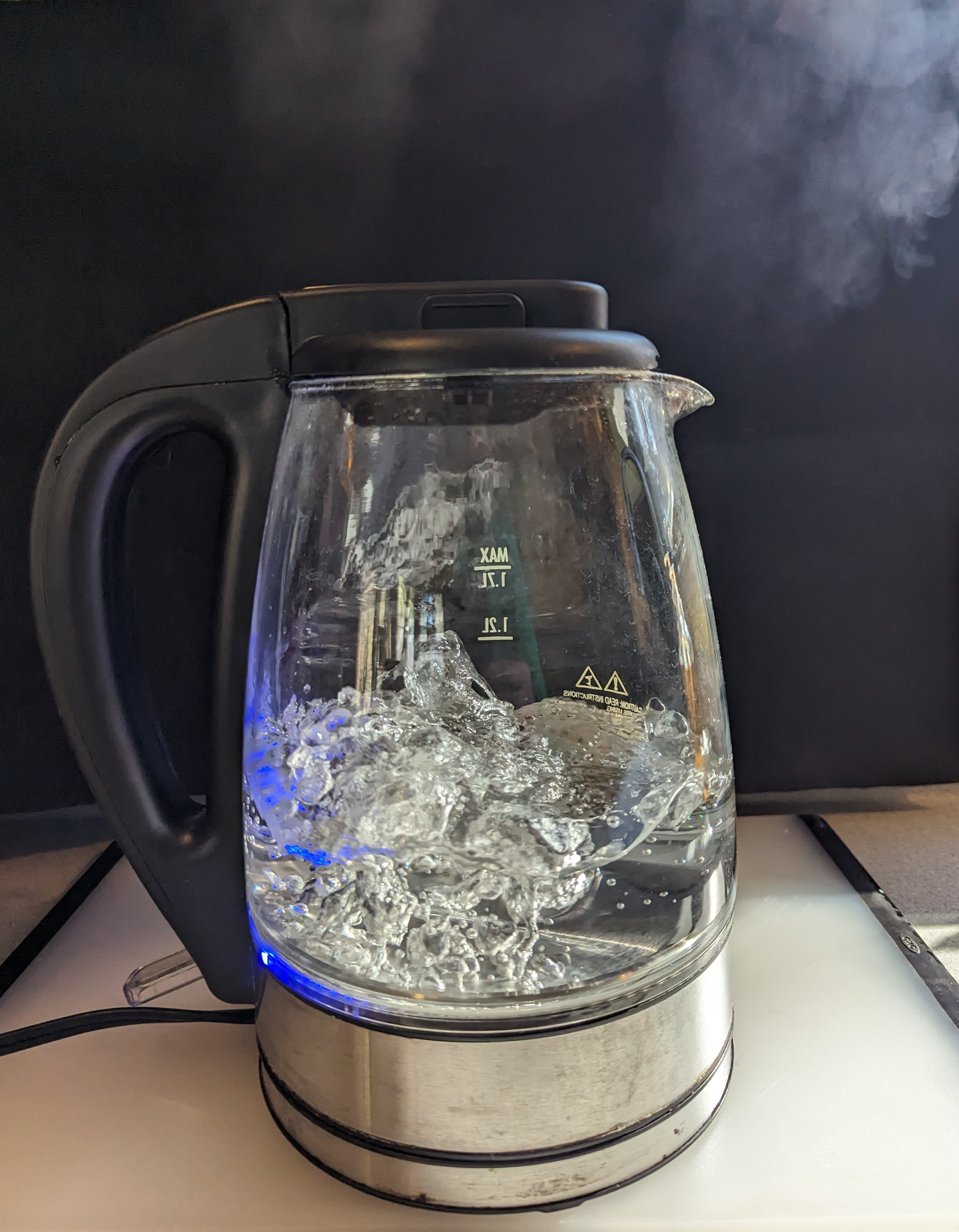
Boiling water creating steam in an electric kettle

Steam's capacity to transfer heat is also used in the home: for cooking vegetables, steam cleaning of fabric, carpets and flooring, and for heating buildings. In each case, water is heated in a boiler, and the steam carries the energy to a target object. Steam is also used in ironing clothes to add enough humidity with the heat to take wrinkles out and put intentional creases into the clothing.

=== Electricity generation (and co-generation) ===
As of 2000, around 90% of all electricity was generated using steam as the working fluid, nearly all by steam turbines.

In electric generation, steam is typically condensed at the end of its expansion cycle, and returned to the boiler for re-use. However, in co-generation, steam is piped into buildings through a district heating system to provide heat energy after its use in the electric generation cycle. The world's biggest steam generation system is the New York City steam system, which pumps steam into 100,000 buildings in Manhattan from seven co-generation plants.

=== Energy storage ===
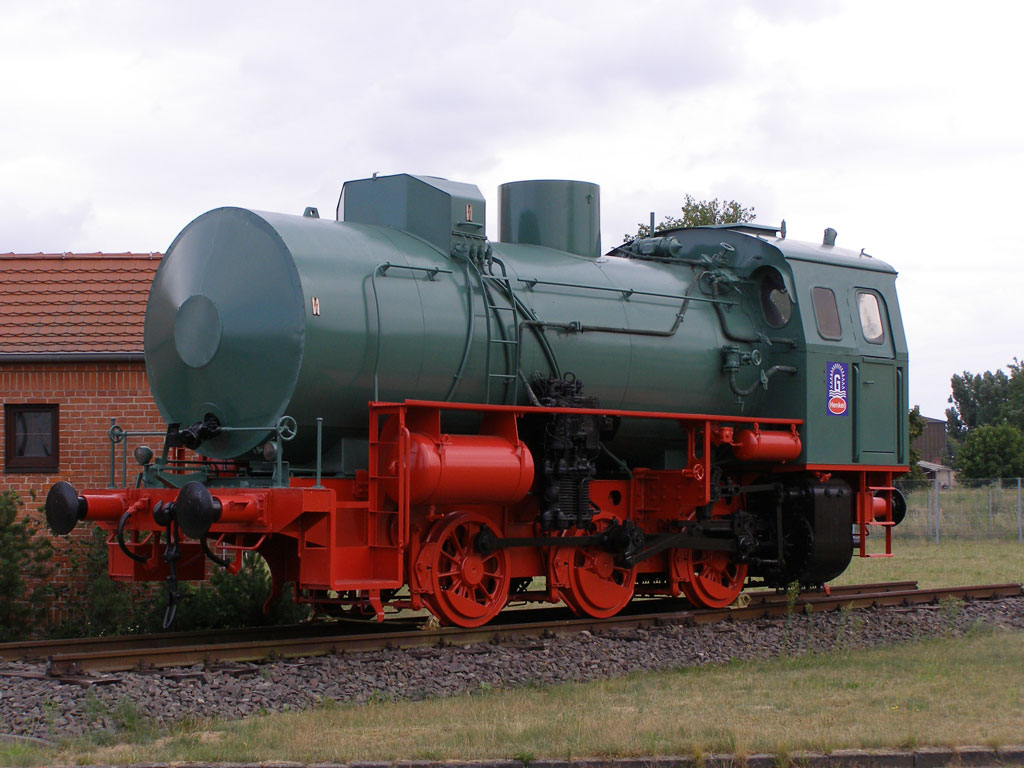
Fireless steam locomotive. Despite the resemblance to a boiler, note the lack of a chimney and also how the cylinders are at the cab end, not the chimney end.

In other industrial applications steam is used for energy storage, which is introduced and extracted by heat transfer, usually through pipes. Steam is a capacious reservoir for thermal energy because of water's high heat of vaporization.

Fireless steam locomotives were steam locomotives that operated from a supply of steam stored on board in a large tank resembling a conventional locomotive's boiler. This tank was filled by process steam, as is available in many sorts of large factory, such as paper mills. The locomotive's propulsion used pistons and connecting rods, as for a typical steam locomotive. These locomotives were mostly used in places where there was a risk of fire from a boiler's firebox, but were also used in factories that simply had a plentiful supply of steam to spare.

=== Mechanical effort ===
Steam engines and steam turbines use the expansion of steam to drive a piston or turbine to perform mechanical work. The ability to return condensed steam as water-liquid to the boiler at high pressure with relatively little expenditure of pumping power is important. Condensation of steam to water often occurs at the low-pressure end of a steam turbine, since this maximizes the energy efficiency, but such wet-steam conditions must be limited to avoid excessive turbine blade erosion. Engineers use an idealised thermodynamic cycle, the Rankine cycle, to model the behaviour of steam engines. Steam turbines are often used in the production of electricity.

=== Sterilization ===
An autoclave, which uses steam under pressure, is used in microbiology laboratories and similar environments for sterilization.

Steam, especially dry (highly superheated) steam, may be used for antimicrobial cleaning even to the levels of sterilization. Steam is a non-toxic antimicrobial agent.

=== Steam in piping ===
Steam is used in piping for utility lines. It is also used in jacketing and tracing of piping to maintain the uniform temperature in pipelines and vessels.

=== Industrial Processes ===
Steam is used across multiple industries for its ability to transfer heat to drive chemical reactions, sterilize or disinfect objects and to maintain constant temperatures. In the lumber industry, steam is used in the process of wood bending, killing insects, and increasing plasticity. Steam is used to accentuate drying of concrete especially in prefabricates. Care should be taken since concrete produces heat during hydration and additional heat from the steam could be detrimental to hardening reaction processes of the concrete. In chemical and petrochemical industries, steam is used in various chemical processes as a reactant. Steam cracking of long chain hydrocarbons produces lower molecular weight hydrocarbons for fuel or other chemical applications. Steam reforming produces syngas or hydrogen.

=== Cleaning ===
Used in cleaning of fibers and other materials, sometimes in preparation for painting. Steam is also useful in melting hardened grease and oil residues, so it is useful in cleaning kitchen floors and equipment and internal combustion engines and parts. Among the advantages of using steam versus a hot water spray are the facts that steam can operate at higher temperatures and it uses substantially less water per minute.

== See also ==
- Electrification
- Food steamer or steam cooker
- Geyser – geothermally-generated steam
- IAPWS – an association that maintains international-standard correlations for the thermodynamic properties of steam, including IAPWS-IF97 (for use in industrial simulation and modelling) and IAPWS-95 (a general purpose and scientific correlation)
- Industrial Revolution
- Mass production
- Oxyhydrogen
- Psychrometrics – moist air–vapor mixtures, humidity, and air conditioning
- Steam–electric power station
- Sterilization (microbiology)
