= Thermogravitational cycle =

Type of thermodynamic fluid effect

A thermogravitational cycle is a reversible thermodynamic cycle using the gravitational works of weight and buoyancy to respectively compress and expand a working fluid.

== Theoretical framework ==
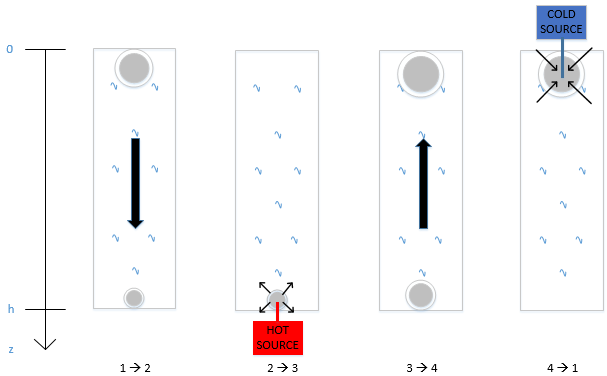
The 4 steps of an ideal thermogravitational cycle. 1→2: adiabatic gravitational compression, 2→3: hot heat transfer, 3→4: adiabatic gravitational expansion, 4→1: cold heat transfer.

Consider a column filled with a transporting medium and a balloon filled with a working fluid. Due to the hydrostatic pressure of the transporting medium, the pressure inside the column increases along the z axis (see figure). Initially, the balloon is inflated by the working fluid at temperature T_{C} and pressure P_{0} and located on top of the column. A thermogravitational cycle is decomposed into four ideal steps:

- 1→2: Descent of the balloon towards the bottom of the column. The working fluid undergoes adiabatic compression with its temperature increasing and its pressure reaching value P_{h} at the bottom (P_{h}>P_{0}).
- 2→3: While the ballon lays at the bottom, the working fluid receives heat from the hot source at temperature T_{H} and undergoes isobaric expansion at pressure P_{h}.
- 3→4: The balloon rises towards the column top. The working fluid undergoes adiabatic expansion with a drop in temperature and reaches pressure P_{0} after expansion when the balloon is on top.
- 4→1: Once arrived on top, the working fluid supplies heat to the cold source at temperature T_{C} while undergoing isobaric compression at pressure P_{0}.

For a thermogravitational cycle to occur, the balloon has to be denser than the transporting medium during 1→2 step and less dense during 3→4 step. If these conditions are not naturally satisfied by the working fluid, a weight can be attached to the balloon to increase its effective mass density.

== Applications and examples ==
Thermogravitational electric generator based on balloon inflation/deflation. A balloon filled with perfluorohexane inflates and deflates due to density changes via heat exchanges. Each time the magnet attached to the balloon passes through the coil, an electrical signal is recorded on the oscilloscope.

An experimental device working according to thermogravitational cycle principle was developed in a laboratory of the University of Bordeaux and patented in France. Such thermogravitational electric generator is based on inflation and deflation cycles of an elastic bag made of nitrile elastomer cut from a glove finger. The bag is filled with a volatile working fluid that has low chemical affinity for the elastomer such as perfluorohexane (C_{6}F_{14}). It is attached to a strong NdFeB spherical magnet that acts both as a weight and for transducing the mechanical energy into voltage. The glass cylinder is filled with water acting as transporting fluid. It is heated at the bottom by a hot circulating water-jacket, and cooled down at the top by a cold water bath. Due to its low boiling point temperature (56 °C), the perfluorohexane drop contained in the bag vaporizes and inflates the balloon. Once its density is lower than the water density, the balloon raises according to Archimedes’ principle. Cooled down at the column top, the balloon deflates partially until its gets effectively denser than water and starts to fall down. As seen from the videos, the cyclic motion has a period of several seconds. These oscillations can last for several hours and their duration is limited only by leaks of the working fluid through the rubbery membrane. Each time the magnet goes through the coil produces a variation in the magnetic flux. An electromotive force is created and detected through an oscilloscope. It has been estimated that the average power of this machine is 7 μW and its efficiency is 4.8 × 10^{−6}. Although these values are very small, this experiment brings a proof of principle of renewable energy device for harvesting electricity from a weak waste heat source without need of other external energy supply, e.g. for a compressor in a regular heat engine. The experiment was successfully reproduced by undergraduate students in preparatory classes of the Lycée Hoche in Versailles.

Thermogravitational cycle experiment performed by Elsa Giraudat and Jean-Baptiste Hubert (while undergraduate students at the Lycée Hoche, Versailles, France) for their personal project in physics. The fluid was perfluoropentane (C_{5}F_{12}) in their case, and the cold source was made by ice blocks floating on the water column. Numerical integration of the electromotive force gave a harvested energy of 192 μJ per cycle.

Several other applications based on the thermogravitational cycles could be found in the literature. For example:

- In solar balloons, heat from the sun is absorbed which causes a balloon filled with air to rise and convert its movement in an electric signal.
- In a gravity driven organic Rankine cycle, gravity is used instead of a pump to pressurize a working fluid. In literature, different authors have studied the working fluid characteristics best suited to optimize their efficiency for gravity-driven ORC devices.
- In a version of a magnetic fluid generator, a refrigerant fluid is vaporized at the bottom of a column by an external heat source, and its bubbles move across a magnetized ferrofluid, thereby producing electric voltage via a linear generator.
- In a conceptual hybrid of several patents, solar or geothermal energy is harnessed by means of a modified organic Rankine cycle with high columns of water below ground

== Cycle efficiency ==
The efficiency η of a thermogravitational cycle depends on the thermodynamic processes the working fluid goes through during each step of the cycle. Below some examples:

- If the heat exchanges at the bottom and top of the column with a hot source and cold source respectively, occur at constant pressure and temperature, the efficiency would be equal to the efficiency of a Carnot cycle:
$\eta = 1 - {T_C \over T_H}$
- If the working fluid stays at the liquid stage during the compression stage 1→2, the efficiency would be equal to the Rankine cycle efficiency. By noting h_{1}, h_{2}, h_{3} and h_{4} the specific enthalpies of the working fluid at stages 1,2,3 and 4 respectively:
$\eta = {(h_3 - h_4) - (h_2 - h_1) \over h_3 - h_2}$
- If the working fluid remains a gas during all the steps of a thermogravitational cycle, the efficiency would be equal to the Brayton cycle efficiency. By noting γ the heat capacity ratio:
$\eta = 1 - \left ( \frac{P_0}{P_h} \right )^{\gamma \over \gamma - 1}$

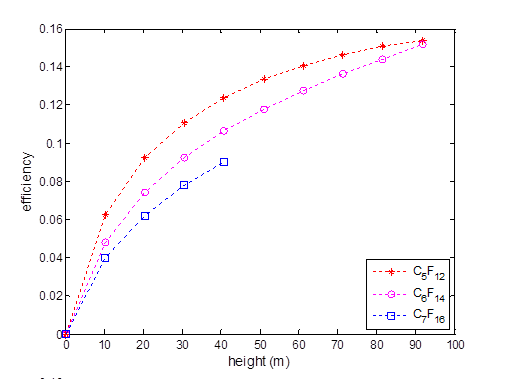
Numerical simulations were carried out with CHEMCAD for three different working fluids (C_{5}F_{12}, C_{6}F_{14}, and C_{7}F_{16}) with hot source temperatures and pressures up to 150 °C (302 °F) and 10 bar, respectively.

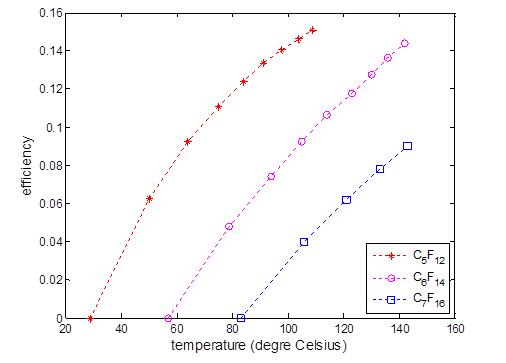
The cold source temperature is set at 20 °C. The working fluid is kept in gas state during the rise and liquid state during the fall of the balloon, respectively. The efficiency is expressed relatively to 1 (i.e., not as a percentage).
