= Richard Mollier =

German scientific academic (1863-1935)

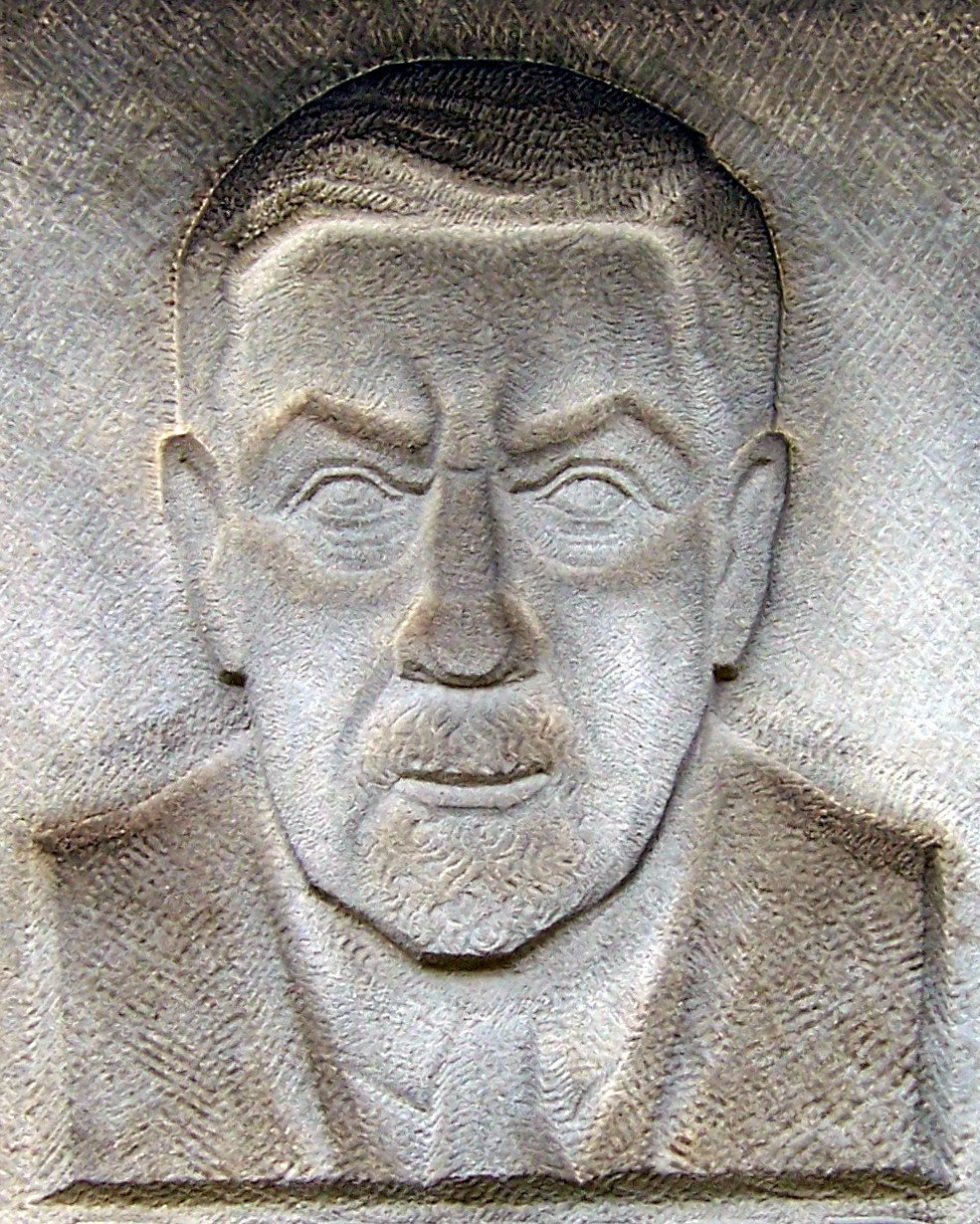
Richard Mollier

Richard Mollier (German: [mɔˈli̯eː]; 30 November 1863, Trieste – 13 March 1935, Dresden) was a German professor of Applied Physics and Mechanics in Göttingen and Dresden, a pioneer of experimental research in thermodynamics, particularly for water, steam, and moist air.

Mollier diagrams (enthalpy-entropy charts) are routinely used by engineers in the design work associated with power plants (fossil or nuclear), compressors, steam turbines, refrigeration systems, and air conditioning equipment to visualize the working cycles of thermodynamic systems.

The Mollier diagram of enthalpy of moist air versus its water vapor content (h–x diagram) is equivalent to the Psychrometrics Chart commonly used in the US and Britain.

== Education and career ==
After attending Gymnasium (grammar school) in Trieste, he commenced studies in mathematics and physics at the university of Graz (Austria), continuing at the Technical University of Munich. He presented his first publications as an outside lecturer for Theoretical Mechanics. After a short stint in Göttingen, he succeeded Gustav Zeuner in 1897 as Professor of Mechanical Engineering at the Technischen Hochschule Dresden. His 1904 publication New Graphs for Technical Thermodynamics greatly simplified calculations involving thermodynamic processes. His New Tables and Diagrams for Water Vapor, first published in 1906, appeared in six further editions through 1932, as he updated it to reflect new developments.

== Honors ==
At the 1923 Thermodynamics Conference held in Los Angeles, it was decided to name, in his honor, as a “Mollier graph” any thermodynamic diagram using the Enthalpy h as one of its axes. Example: the h–s graph for steam or the h–x graph for moist air.

== Publications ==
- Die Entropie der Wärme (The Entropy of Heat) 1895
- Dampftafeln und Diagramme des Kohlendioxid (Vapor Tables and Diagrams for Carbon Dioxide) 1896
- Neue Diagramme zur Technischen Wärmelehre (New Graphs for Technical Thermodynamics) 1904
- Neue Tabellen und Diagramme für Wasserdampf (New Tables and Diagrams for Water Vapor) Berlin 1906

== See also ==
- Psychrometrics
