= Homentropic flow =

Fluid flow with uniform and costant entropy

In fluid mechanics, a homentropic flow has uniform and constant entropy. It distinguishes itself from an isentropic or particle isentropic flow, where the entropy level of each fluid particle does not change with time, but may vary from particle to particle. This means that a homentropic flow is necessarily isentropic, but an isentropic flow need not be homentropic.

A homentropic and perfect gas is an example of a barotropic fluid where the pressure and density are related by
$$P(\rho) = K\rho^\gamma,$$
where $K$ is a constant.
