= Mercury vapour turbine =

Heat engine using mercury as its working fluid

A mercury vapour turbine is a form of heat engine that uses mercury as the working fluid of its thermal cycle. A mercury vapour turbine has been used in conjunction with a steam turbine for generating electricity. This example of combined cycle generation was not widely adopted because of high capital cost and the toxic hazard of the mercury potentially leaking into the environment.

The mercury cycle offers an efficiency increase compared to a steam-only cycle because energy can be injected into the Rankine cycle at higher temperature. Metallurgical developments have allowed steam-only plants to increase in efficiency over time, making the mercury vapour turbine obsolete. Modern combined cycle power plant generating stations operate at 61% efficiency, and with none of the safety issues inherent to a binary mercury Rankine cycle steam power plant.

== Historical example ==
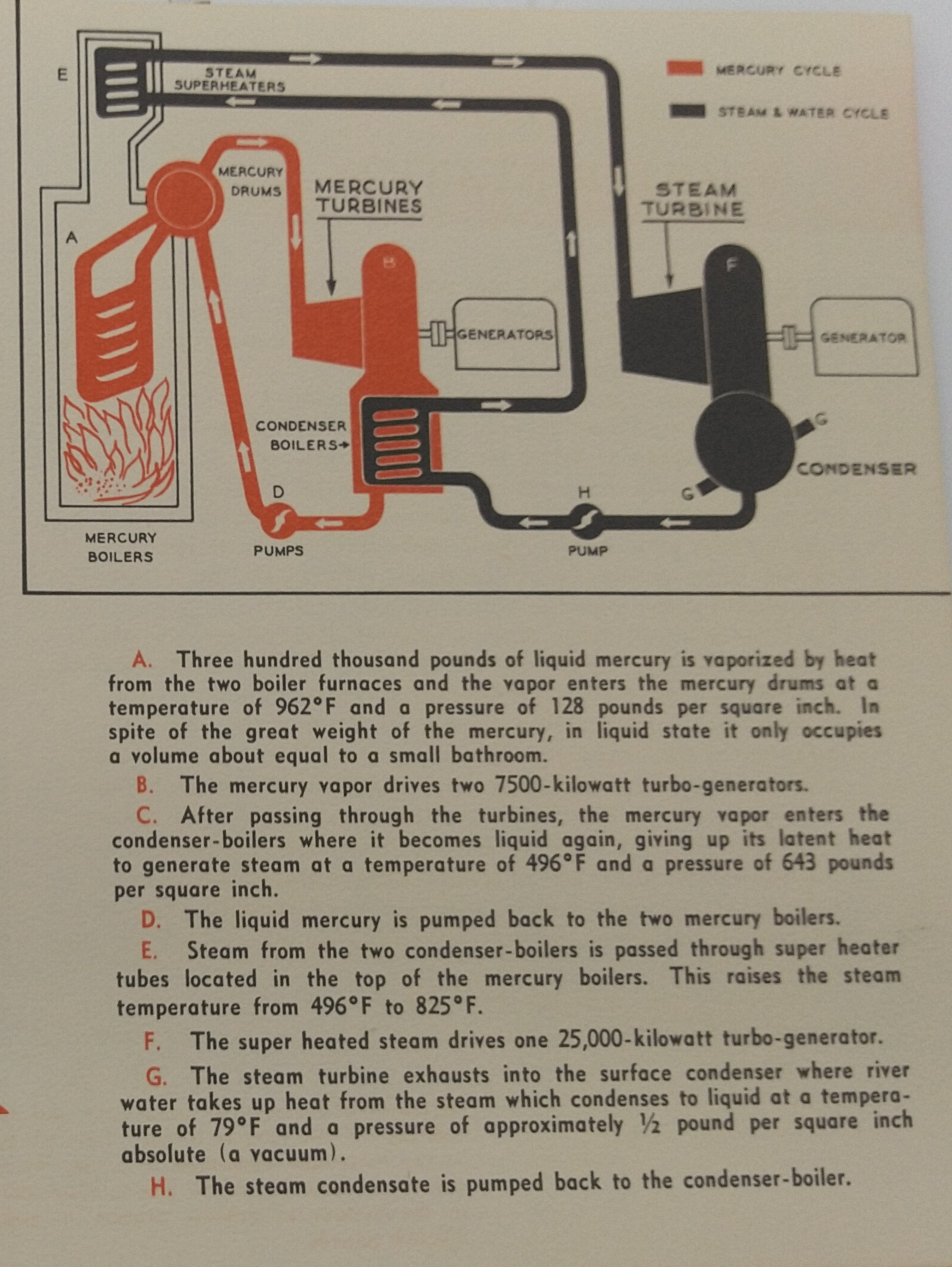
Diagram of Mercury Vapor Turbine System at Schiller Station in Portsmouth, New Hampshire, USA

The Electrical Year Book, 1937, contained the following description of a mercury vapour turbine operating in commercial use:

The advantage of operating a mercury-vapour turbine in conjunction with a steam power plant lies in the fact that the complete cycle can be worked over a very wide range of temperature without employing any abnormal pressure. The exhaust from the mercury turbine is used to raise steam for the steam turbine. The Hartford Electric Light Co. (U.S.A.) has a 10,000kW turbo-generator driven by mercury vapour, which reaches the turbine at 70 lb. per sq. in. (gauge), 880°F. The mercury vapour is condensed at 445°F and raises 129,000 lb. steam per hr. at 280 lb. per sq. in. pressure. The latter is superheated to 735°F and passed to the steam turbines. During 4 months continuous operation, this plant averaged about 0.715 lb. of coal per kWh of net output, about 43% of the output being from the mercury turbine generator and 57% from the steam plant. On maintained full-load the heat output averages 9800 BTU per net kWh [34.8% efficiency]. It is believed that maintenance costs will be lower than in ordinary steam plant. The back-pressure on the mercury turbine is fixed by the steam boiler pressure; only a small vacuum pump is needed, as there is no air or other gas in the mercury system.

Power plants designed by William Le Roy Emmet were constructed by General Electric and operated between 1923 and 1950. Large plants included:

- Hartford, Connecticut, 1.8 MW, starting in 1922, uprated in stages to 15 MW in 1949
- Kearny Generating Station, New Jersey, 20 MW mercury turbine +30 MW steam, started 1933
- Schenectady, New York
- Portsmouth, New Hampshire, 40 MW, 1950
