= Isentropic process =

Thermodynamic process that is reversible and adiabatic

An isentropic process is an idealized thermodynamic process that is both adiabatic and reversible. Clausius (1875) adopted "isentropic" as meaning the same as Rankine's word: "adiabatic". The work transfers of the system are frictionless, and there is no net transfer of heat or matter. Such an idealized process is useful in engineering as a model of and basis of comparison for real processes. This process is idealized because reversible processes do not occur in reality; thinking of a process as both adiabatic and reversible would show that the initial and final entropies are the same, thus, the reason it is called isentropic (entropy does not change). Thermodynamic processes are named based on the effect they would have on the system (ex. isovolumetric/isochoric: constant volume, isenthalpic: constant enthalpy). Even though in reality it is not necessarily possible to carry out an isentropic process, some may be approximated as such.

The word "isentropic" derives from the process being one in which the entropy of the system remains unchanged, in addition to a process which is both adiabatic and reversible.

== Background ==
The second law of thermodynamics states that

$$T_\text{surr}dS \ge \delta Q,$$

where $\delta Q$ is the amount of energy the system gains by heating, $T_\text{surr}$ is the temperature of the surroundings, and $dS$ is the change in entropy. Equality is reached in a reversible process, which is an imagined idealized theoretical limit, never actually occurring in physical reality, with essentially equal temperatures of system and surroundings. For an isentropic process, if also reversible, there is no transfer of energy as heat because the process is adiabatic; δQ = 0. In contrast, if the process is irreversible, entropy is produced within the system; consequently, in order to maintain constant entropy within the system, energy must be simultaneously removed from the system as heat.

For reversible processes, an isentropic transformation is carried out by thermally "insulating" the system from its surroundings. Temperature is the thermodynamic conjugate variable to entropy, thus the conjugate process would be an isothermal process, in which the system is thermally "connected" to a constant-temperature heat bath.

== Isentropic processes in thermodynamic systems ==
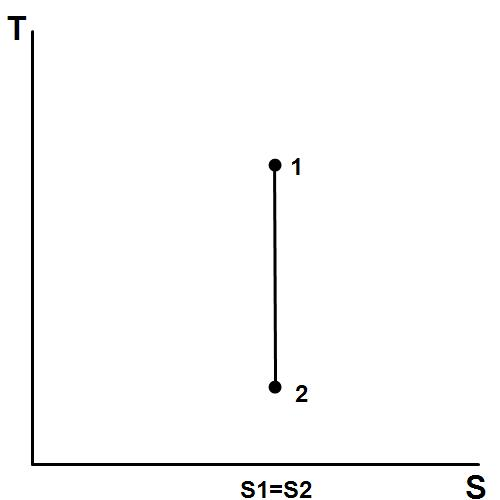
T–s (entropy vs. temperature) diagram of an isentropic process, which is a vertical line segment

The entropy of a given mass does not change during a process that is internally reversible and adiabatic. A process during which the entropy remains constant is called an isentropic process, written $\Delta s=0$ or $s_1 = s_2$. Some examples of theoretically isentropic thermodynamic devices are pumps, gas compressors, turbines, nozzles, and diffusers.

=== Isentropic efficiencies of steady-flow devices in thermodynamic systems ===
Most steady-flow devices operate under adiabatic conditions, and the ideal process for these devices is the isentropic process. The parameter that describes how efficiently a device approximates a corresponding isentropic device is called isentropic or adiabatic efficiency.

Isentropic efficiency of turbines:

$$\eta_\text{t} = \frac{\text{actual turbine work}}{\text{isentropic turbine work}} = \frac{W_a}{W_s} \cong \frac{h_1 - h_{2a}}{h_1 - h_{2s}}.$$

Isentropic efficiency of compressors:

$$\eta_\text{c} = \frac{\text{isentropic compressor work}}{\text{actual compressor work}} = \frac{W_s}{W_a} \cong \frac{h_{2s} - h_1}{h_{2a} - h_1}.$$

Isentropic efficiency of nozzles:

$$\eta_\text{n} = \frac{\text{actual KE at nozzle exit}}{\text{isentropic KE at nozzle exit}} = \frac{V_{2a}^2}{V_{2s}^2} \cong \frac{h_1 - h_{2a}}{h_1 - h_{2s}}.$$

For all the above equations:

$h_1$ is the specific enthalpy at the entrance state,
$h_{2a}$ is the specific enthalpy at the exit state for the actual process,
$h_{2s}$ is the specific enthalpy at the exit state for the isentropic process.

=== Isentropic devices in thermodynamic cycles ===
Cycle	Isentropic step	Description
Ideal Rankine cycle	1→2	Isentropic compression in a pump
Ideal Rankine cycle	3→4	Isentropic expansion in a turbine
Ideal Carnot cycle	2→3	Isentropic expansion
Ideal Carnot cycle	4→1	Isentropic compression
Ideal Otto cycle	1→2	Isentropic compression
Ideal Otto cycle	3→4	Isentropic expansion
Ideal Diesel cycle	1→2	Isentropic compression
Ideal Diesel cycle	3→4	Isentropic expansion
Ideal Brayton cycle	1→2	Isentropic compression in a compressor
Ideal Brayton cycle	3→4	Isentropic expansion in a turbine
Ideal vapor-compression refrigeration cycle	1→2	Isentropic compression in a compressor
Ideal Lenoir cycle	2→3	Isentropic expansion
Ideal Seiliger cycle	1→2	Isentropic compression
Ideal Seiliger cycle	4→5	Isentropic compression

Note: The isentropic assumptions are only applicable with ideal cycles. Real cycles have inherent losses due to compressor and turbine inefficiencies and the second law of thermodynamics. Real systems are not truly isentropic, but isentropic behavior is an adequate approximation for many calculation purposes.

== Isentropic flow ==
In fluid dynamics, an isentropic flow is a fluid flow that is both adiabatic and reversible. That is, no heat is added to the flow, and no energy transformations occur due to friction or dissipative effects. For an isentropic flow of a perfect gas, several relations can be derived to define the pressure, density and temperature along a streamline.

Note that energy can be exchanged with the flow in an isentropic transformation, as long as it doesn't happen as heat exchange. An example of such an exchange would be an isentropic expansion or compression that entails work done on or by the flow.

For an isentropic flow, entropy density can vary between different streamlines. If the entropy density is the same everywhere, then the flow is said to be homentropic.

=== Derivation of the isentropic relations ===
For a closed system, the total change in energy of a system is the sum of the work done and the heat added:

$$dU = \delta W + \delta Q.$$

The reversible work done on a system by changing the volume is

$$\delta W = -p \,dV,$$

where $p$ is the pressure, and $V$ is the volume. The change in enthalpy ($H = U + pV$) is given by

$$dH = dU + p \,dV + V \,dp.$$

Then for a process that is both reversible and adiabatic (i.e. no heat transfer occurs), $\delta Q_\text{rev} = 0$, and so $dS = \delta Q_\text{rev}/T = 0$ All reversible adiabatic processes are isentropic. This leads to two important observations:

$$dU = \delta W + \delta Q = -p \,dV + 0,$$
$$dH = \delta W + \delta Q + p \,dV + V \,dp = -p \,dV + 0 + p \,dV + V \,dp = V \,dp.$$

Next, a great deal can be computed for isentropic processes of an ideal gas. For any transformation of an ideal gas, it is always true that

$dU = n C_v \,dT$, and $dH = n C_p \,dT.$

Using the general results derived above for $dU$ and $dH$, then

$$dU = n C_v \,dT = -p \,dV,$$
$$dH = n C_p \,dT = V \,dp.$$

So for an ideal gas, the heat capacity ratio can be written as

$$\gamma = \frac{C_p}{C_V} = -\frac{dp/p}{dV/V}.$$

For a calorically perfect gas $\gamma$ is constant. Hence on integrating the above equation, assuming a calorically perfect gas, we get

$$pV^\gamma = \text{constant},$$

that is,

$$\frac{p_2}{p_1} = \left(\frac{V_1}{V_2}\right)^\gamma.$$

Using the equation of state for an ideal gas, $p V = n R T$,

$$TV^{\gamma-1} = \text{constant}.$$

(Proof: $PV^\gamma = \text{constant} \Rightarrow PV\,V^{\gamma-1} = \text{constant} \Rightarrow nRT\,V^{\gamma-1} = \text{constant}.$ But nR = constant itself, so $TV^{\gamma-1} = \text{constant}$.)

$$\frac{p^{\gamma-1}}{T^\gamma} = \text{constant}$$

also, for constant $C_p = C_v + R$ (per mole),

$\frac{V}{T} = \frac{nR}{p}$ and $p = \frac{nRT}{V}$

$$S_2-S_1 = nC_p \ln\left(\frac{T_2}{T_1}\right) - nR\ln\left(\frac{p_2}{p_1}\right)$$

$$\frac{S_2-S_1}{n} = C_p \ln\left(\frac{T_2}{T_1}\right) - R\ln\left(\frac{T_2 V_1}{T_1 V_2}\right ) = C_v\ln\left(\frac{T_2}{T_1}\right)+ R \ln\left(\frac{V_2}{V_1}\right)$$

Thus for isentropic processes with an ideal gas,

$T_2 = T_1\left(\frac{V_1}{V_2}\right)^{(R/C_v)}$ or $V_2 = V_1\left(\frac{T_1}{T_2}\right)^{(C_v/R)}$

=== Table of isentropic relations for an ideal gas ===
$\frac{T_2}{T_1}$	$=$	$\left (\frac{P_2}{P_1} \right )^\frac {\gamma-1}{\gamma}$	$=$	$\left (\frac{V_1}{V_2} \right )^{(\gamma-1)}$	$=$	$\left (\frac{\rho_2}{\rho_1} \right )^{(\gamma - 1)}$
$\left (\frac{T_2}{T_1} \right )^\frac {\gamma}{\gamma-1}$	$=$	$\frac {P_2} {P_1}$	$=$	$\left (\frac{V_1}{V_2} \right )^{\gamma}$	$=$	$\left (\frac{\rho_2}{\rho_1} \right )^{\gamma}$
$\left (\frac{T_1}{T_2} \right )^\frac {1}{\gamma-1}$	$=$	$\left (\frac{P_1}{P_2} \right )^\frac {1}{\gamma}$	$=$	$\frac{V_2}{V_1}$	$=$	$\frac{\rho_1}{\rho_2}$
$\left (\frac{T_2}{T_1} \right )^\frac {1}{\gamma-1}$	$=$	$\left (\frac{P_2}{P_1} \right )^\frac {1}{\gamma}$	$=$	$\frac{V_1}{V_2}$	$=$	$\frac{\rho_2}{\rho_1}$

Derived from

$$PV^{\gamma} = \text{constant},$$
$$PV = m R_s T,$$
$$P = \rho R_s T,$$

where:

$P$ = pressure,
$V$ = volume,
$\gamma$ = ratio of specific heats = $C_p/C_v$,
$T$ = temperature,
$m$ = mass,
$R_s$ = gas constant for the specific gas = $R/M$,
$R$ = universal gas constant,
$M$ = molecular weight of the specific gas,
$\rho$ = density,
$C_p$ = molar specific heat at constant pressure,
$C_v$ = molar specific heat at constant volume.

== See also ==
- Gas laws
- Adiabatic process
- Isenthalpic process
- Isentropic analysis
- Polytropic process
