= Isenthalpic process =

Thermodynamic process with no change in enthalpy

An isenthalpic process or isoenthalpic process is a process that proceeds without any change in enthalpy, H; or specific enthalpy, h.

If a steady-state, steady-flow process is analysed using a control volume, everything outside the control volume is considered to be the surroundings.

== Definition and formula ==
Such a process will be isenthalpic if there is no transfer of heat to or from the surroundings, no work done on or by the surroundings, and no change in the kinetic energy of the fluid. This is a sufficient but not necessary condition for isoenthalpy. The necessary condition for a process to be isoenthalpic is that the sum of each of the terms of the energy balance other than enthalpy (work, heat, changes in kinetic energy, etc.) cancel each other, so that the enthalpy remains unchanged. For a process in which magnetic and electric effects (among others) give negligible contributions, the associated energy balance can be written as

$dK + du = Q + W$

$du = d(h - PV) = dh - d(PV)$

$dK + dh - d(PV) = Q + W$

If $dh = 0$ then it must be that

$dK - d(PV) = Q + W$

Where K is kinetic energy, u is internal energy, Q is heat, W is work, h is enthalpy, P is pressure, and V is volume.

== Example ==
The throttling process is a good example of an isoenthalpic process in which significant changes in pressure and temperature can occur to the fluid, and yet the net sum of the associated terms in the energy balance is null, thus rendering the transformation isoenthalpic. The lifting of a relief (or safety) valve on a pressure vessel is an example of throttling process. The specific enthalpy of the fluid inside the pressure vessel is the same as the specific enthalpy of the fluid as it escapes through the valve. With a knowledge of the specific enthalpy of the fluid and the pressure outside the pressure vessel, it is possible to determine the temperature and speed of the escaping fluid.

In an isenthalpic process:

- $h_1 = h_2$,
- $dh = 0$.

Isenthalpic processes on an ideal gas follow isotherms, since $dh = 0 = n c_p \,dT$.

== See also ==
- Adiabatic process
- Joule–Thomson effect
- Ideal gas laws
- Isentropic process
