= Annual fuel utilization efficiency =

Measure of thermal efficiency

The annual fuel utilization efficiency (AFUE; pronounced 'A'-'Few' or 'A'-'F'-'U'-'E') is a thermal efficiency measure of space-heating furnaces and boilers. The AFUE differs from the true 'thermal efficiency' in that it is not a steady-state, peak measure of conversion efficiency, but instead attempts to represent the actual, season-long, average efficiency of that piece of equipment, including the operating transients. It is a dimensionless ratio of useful energy output to energy input, expressed as a percentage. For example, a 90% AFUE for a gas furnace means it outputs 90 BTUs of useful heating for every 100 BTUs of natural gas input (where the rest may be wasted heat in the exhaust). A higher AFUE means higher efficiency.

The method for determining the AFUE for residential furnaces and boilers is the subject of ASHRAE Standard 103. A furnace with a thermal efficiency (η_{th}) of 78% may yield an AFUE of only 64% or so, for example, under the standard's test conditions. When estimating annual or seasonal energy used by combustion devices, the AFUE is the better efficiency measure to use in the calculations. But for an instantaneous fuel consumption rate, the thermal efficiency may be better.

The theoretical limit for a conventional furnace's instantaneous efficiency is 100%, whereas a heat pump used for building heating may exceed 100%. For example, a COP of 1.5 is equivalent to 150%. Heat pumps are readily available for electric and gas sources. So from a theoretical perspective, in some use cases the name "efficiency" may be misleading.

Some typical AFUE numbers
Fuel	Furnace/boiler	AFUE
Heating oil	Cast iron (pre-1970)	60%
Heating oil	Retention head burner	70–78%
Heating oil	Mid efficiency	83–89%
Electric heating	Central or baseboard	100%
Electric heating	Geothermal heat pump	see COP
Electric heating	Air source heat pump	see HSPF
Natural gas
Natural gas	Standard efficiency	78–84%
Natural gas	Condensing	90–97%
Propane
Propane	Standard efficiency	79–85%
Propane	Condensing	88–95%
Firewood	Conventional	45–55%
Firewood	Advanced	55–65%
Firewood	State-of-the-Art	75–90%

== See also ==
- Coefficient of performance (COP)
- Energy efficiency ratio (EER)
- Seasonal energy efficiency ratio (SEER)
- ASHRAE
- Air-Conditioning, Heating, and Refrigeration Institute (AHRI)
