= Furnace (central heating) =

Device used for heating buildings

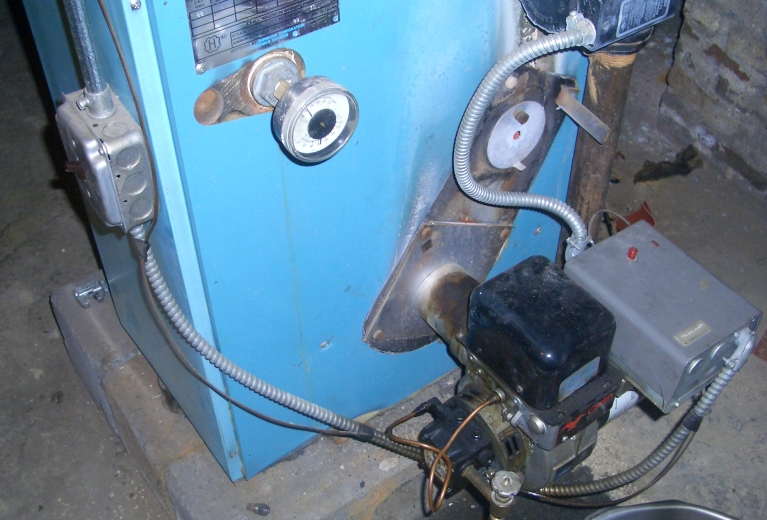
An oil-burning furnace

A wood-fire furnace made of cast-iron

A furnace is an appliance and fixture that is used to generate hot air for all or part of a building. Furnaces are mostly used as a major component of a central heating system.

The most common fuel source for modern furnaces in North America and much of Europe is natural gas; other common fuel sources include LPG (liquefied petroleum gas), fuel oil, wood and in rare cases coal. In some areas electrical resistance heating is used, especially where the cost of electricity is low or the primary purpose is for air conditioning.

Modern high-efficiency furnaces can be up to 98% efficient and operate without a chimney, with a typical gas furnace being about 80% efficient. Waste gas and heat are mechanically ventilated through either metal flue pipes or polyvinyl chloride (PVC) pipes that can be vented through the side or roof of the structure. Fuel efficiency in a gas furnace is measured in AFUE (Annual Fuel Utilization Efficiency).

== Etymology ==
The name derives from Latin word fornax, which means oven.

== Categories ==
Furnaces can be classified into four general categories, based on efficiency and design, natural draft, forced-air, forced draft, and condensing.

=== Natural draft ===
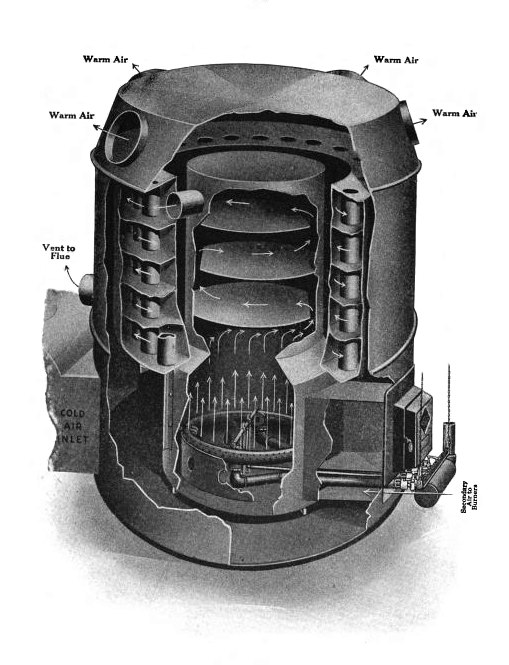
Diagram of natural draft gas furnace, early 20th century.

The first category of furnaces is natural draft, atmospheric burner furnaces. These furnaces consisted of cast-iron or riveted-steel heat exchangers built within an outer shell of brick, masonry, or steel. The heat exchangers were vented through brick or masonry chimneys. Air circulation depended on large, upwardly pitched pipes constructed of wood or metal. The pipes would channel the warm air into floor or wall vents inside the home. This method of heating worked because warm air rises.

The system was simple, had few controls, a single automatic gas valve, and no blower. These furnaces could be made to work with any fuel simply by adapting the burner area. They have been operated with wood, coke, coal, trash, paper, natural gas, fuel oil as well as whale oil for a brief period at the turn of the century. Furnaces that used solid fuels required daily maintenance to remove ash and "clinkers" that accumulated in the bottom of the burner area. In later years, these furnaces were adapted with electric blowers to aid air distribution and speed moving heat into the home. Gas and oil-fired systems were usually controlled by a thermostat inside the home, while most wood and coal-fired furnaces had no electrical connection and were controlled by the amount of fuel in the burner and position of the fresh-air damper on the burner access door.

=== Forced-air ===
The second category of furnace is the forced-air having atmospheric burner style with a cast-iron or sectional steel heat exchanger. Through the 1950s and 1960s, this style of furnace was used to replace the big, natural draft systems, and was sometimes installed on the existing gravity duct work. The heated air was moved by blowers which were belted driven and designed for a wide range of speeds. These furnaces were still big and bulky compared to modern furnaces, and had heavy-steel exteriors with bolt-on removable panels. Energy efficiency would range anywhere from just over 50% to upward of 65% AFUE. This style furnace still used large, masonry or brick chimneys for flues and was eventually designed to accommodate air-conditioning systems.

=== Forced draft ===
The third category of furnace is the forced draft, mid-efficiency furnace with a steel heat exchanger and multi-speed blower. These furnaces were physically much more compact than the previous styles. They were equipped with combustion air blowers that would pull air through the heat exchanger which greatly increased fuel efficiency while allowing the heat exchangers to become smaller. These furnaces may have multi-speed blowers and were designed to work with central air-conditioning systems.

=== Condensing ===
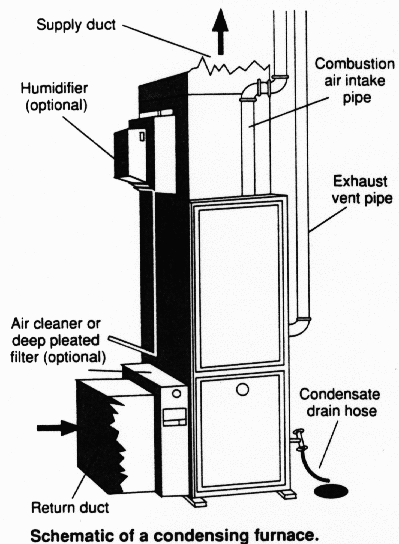
A condensing furnace

The fourth category of furnace is the high-efficiency condensing gas furnace. High efficiency condensing gas furnaces typically achieve between 90% and 98% AFUE. A condensing gas furnace includes a sealed combustion area, combustion draft inducer and a secondary heat exchanger. The primary gain in efficiency for a condensing gas furnace, as compared to a mid-efficiency forced-air or forced-draft furnace, is the capture of latent heat from the exhaust gases in the secondary heat exchanger. The secondary heat exchanger removes most of the heat energy from the exhaust gas, actually condensing water vapour and other chemicals (which form a mild acid) as it operates. The vent pipes, also known as the exhaust system, are often installed using PVC pipe instead of metal venting pipe to prevent corrosion, but this will vary based on geographical location of the installation and local regulations. The draft inducer allows for the exhaust piping to be routed vertically or horizontally as it exits the structure. A typical installation arrangement for high-efficiency furnaces includes a fresh air intake (supply) pipe that brings fresh air from outside the home to the furnace combustion unit. Normally the fresh combustion air is routed alongside the exhaust PVC during installation and the pipes exit through a sidewall of the home in the same location. High efficiency furnaces typically deliver a 25% to 35% fuel savings over a 60% AFUE furnace.

== Types of furnace output control ==
=== Single-stage ===
A single-stage furnace has only one stage of operation, it is either on or off. This means that it is relatively noisy, always running at the highest speed, and always pumping out the hottest air at the highest velocity.

One of the benefits to a single-stage furnace is typically the cost for installation. Single-stage furnaces are relatively inexpensive since the technology is rather simple. However, the simplicity of single-stage gas furnaces come at the cost of blower motor noise and mechanical inefficiency. The blower motors on these single-stage furnaces consume more energy overall because, regardless of the heating requirements of the space, the fan and blower motors operate at a fixed speed. Due to its one-speed operation, a single-stage furnace is also called a single-speed furnace.

=== Two-stage ===
A two-stage furnace has to do two stage full speed and half (or reduced) speed. Depending on the demanded heat, they can run at a lower speed most of the time. They can be quieter, move the air at less velocity, and will better keep the desired temperature in the house.

=== Modulating ===
A modulating furnace can modulate the heat output and air velocity nearly continuously, depending on the demanded heat and outside temperature. This means that it only works as much as necessary and therefore saves energy.

== Heat distribution ==
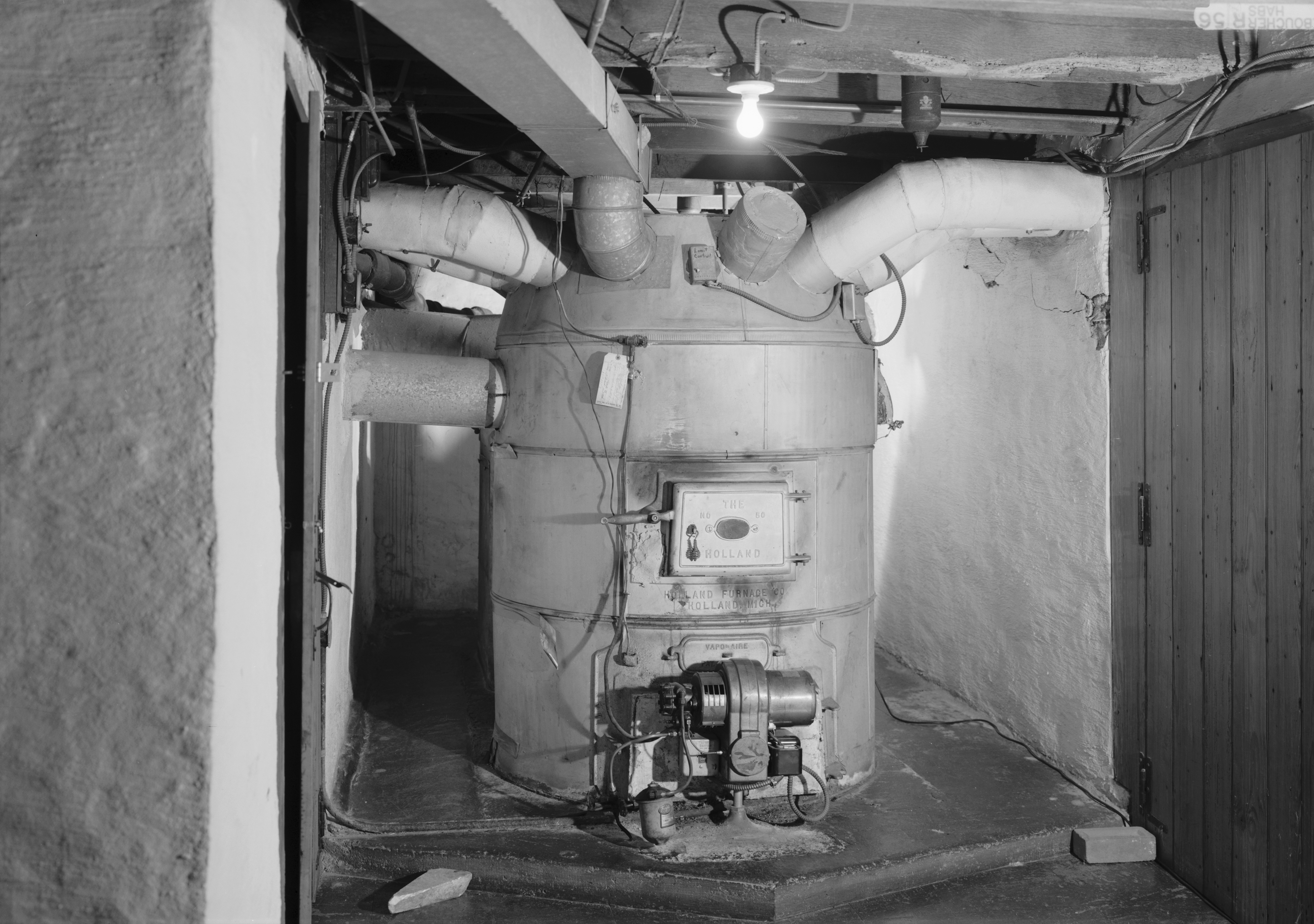
"Octopus" furnace with oil burner.

Air convection heating systems have been in use for over a century. Older systems rely on a passive air circulation system where the greater density of cooler air causes it to sink into the furnace area below, through air return registers in the floor, and the lesser density of warmed air causes it to rise in the ductwork; the two forces acting together to drive air circulation in a system termed 'gravity-fed'. The layout of these 'octopus’ furnaces and their duct systems is optimized with various diameters of large dampered ducts.

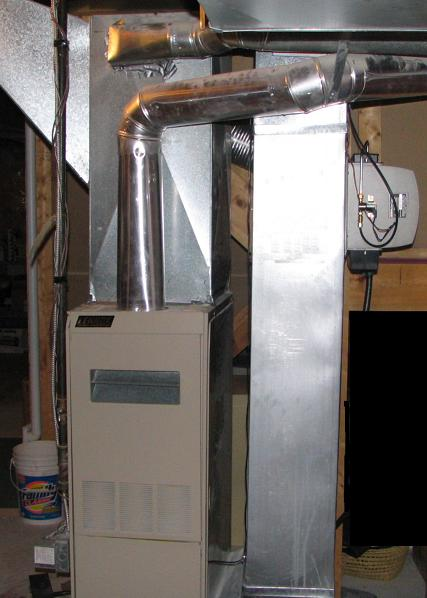
Forced-air gas furnace, design circa 1991.

By comparison, most modern "warm air" furnaces typically use a fan to circulate air to the rooms of house and pull cooler air back to the furnace for reheating; this is called forced-air heat. Because the fan easily overcomes the resistance of the ductwork, the arrangement of ducts can be far more flexible than the octopus of old. Separate ducts collect cool air to be returned to the furnace. At the furnace, cool air passes into the furnace, usually through an air filter, through the blower, then through the heat exchanger of the furnace, whence it is blown throughout the building. One major advantage of this type of system is that it also enables easy installation of central air conditioning, simply by adding a cooling coil at the outlet of the furnace.

Air is circulated through ductwork, which may be made of sheet metal or plastic "flex" duct, and is insulated or uninsulated. Unless the ducts and plenum have been sealed using mastic or foil duct tape, the ductwork is likely to have a high leakage of conditioned air, possibly into unconditioned spaces. Another cause of wasted energy is the installation of ductwork in unheated areas, such as attics and crawl spaces; or ductwork of air conditioning systems in attics in warm climates.

== See also ==
- Phase-out of gas boilers
- Condensing boiler
- Forced-air gas
- Jetstream furnace
- Outdoor wood-fired boiler
- Masonry heater
- Heat pump
