= Heating system =

Heating of air in buildings or vehicles

A heating system is a mechanism designed to maintain a desired temperature in a space by adding thermal energy. It is a fundamental component of heating, ventilation, and air conditioning (HVAC) systems, providing warmth to residential, commercial, and industrial buildings. Heating systems are of two main types: central and distributed. Central heating systems generate heat (electrically or by burning gas/coal) in a single location and distribute the heat through ducts, pipes, or radiators. Distributed heating systems use local heat sources, such as space heaters and fireplaces, and do not use ducts, pipes, or conventional radiators. Heating systems are critical in ensuring indoor comfort, especially in colder regions.

== Types and uses ==
=== Central heating systems ===
Central heating systems produce heat in one central location and distribute it throughout the building. This category includes furnaces, boilers, and heat pumps. Central heating is often used in applications such as warehouses, offices and education buildings. This is because of their energy efficiency, heating distribution and noise when in operation.

=== Distributed heating systems ===
Distributed heating systems generate heat in the space they are to heat, without extensive duct systems. Examples include electric space heaters, fireplaces, and solar heating. Distributed heating systems can be used in combination with central heating to allow year round climate control. Distributed heating is often used in urban areas where the houses are closely compacted together.

== Efficiency and environmental impact ==
The efficiency of a heating system is typically measured by its AFUE (Annual Fuel Utilization Efficiency) rating. Higher AFUE ratings indicate a more efficient furnace. Environmental impacts are a concern with heating systems, especially those that burn fossil fuels. The use of sustainable energy sources and energy-efficient systems is encouraged to reduce greenhouse gas emissions. The main source of harmful greenhouse gas emissions is the type of heating systems being used. For example, central heating systems depending on what they use to burn/electricity consumed to heat the system. Another environmental impact is during winter months heating systems depend heavily more on fossil fuel based energy production. The use of coal, natural gas, and oil to power heating systems is a direct link to greenhouse-based gas emissions.

Heat pumps can be used for heating and cooling, transferring heat using refrigerant and electricity, making them more efficient than other heating systems. Heat pumps are most often used in places where the temperature stays around 40 degrees. When operating below 40° (F) heating pumps lose some of their efficiency. Although with current trends this has become less of an issue as countries like Norway, Sweden, and Finland have begun installing heat pumps more often in buildings.

== Change over time ==
Advancements in heating technology focus on increasing energy efficiency and reducing environmental impact. Trends include the integration of smart home technology for better system control through allowing heat schedules, zones, and remote control. The use of renewable energy sources like geothermal heating, solar panels, and biomass. Current trends are toward heating pumps and using renewable energy/low carbon emission energy to power these heaters. Swapping out the current fossil-fuel based heaters for electric ones lowers emissions in the heating industry. Heating pumps are a noteworthy trend because of their duality in use. Places like Norway, Sweden, and Finland have had heat pumps become more popular in the recent years due to their improved efficiency over other traditional heating methods.

== See also ==
- Central heating
- HVAC
- Boiler
- Radiator
- Solar energy
- Heating plant
