= Seasonal energy efficiency ratio =

Cooling output divided by electricity input, as a standard for HVAC systems

The seasonal energy efficiency ratio (SEER) is a measurement used to rate the efficiency of air conditioners. The SEER rating of a device is the cooling output during a typical cooling-season divided by the total electric energy input during the same period. The higher a device's SEER rating, the more energy efficient it is.

SEER is defined for the United States by the Air Conditioning, Heating, and Refrigeration Institute, a trade association, in its 2008 standard AHRI 210/240, Performance Rating of Unitary Air-Conditioning and Air-Source Heat Pump Equipment. This defines SEER as the ratio of cooling in British thermal units (BTUs) to the energy consumed in watt-hours. The device testing protocol was changed in 2023 to include more accurately the energy used when cooled air is pushed through ducts. The revised protocol produces smaller numbers identified in documentation as SEER2 measurements.

European legislation defines SEER as the reference annual cooling demand divided by the annual electricity consumption for cooling of a device. The legislation requires that many air conditioners offered for sale in the EU must bear labels including SEER ratings measured in a standardized way. This is often referred to as the European seasonal energy efficiency ratio (ESEER) to distinguish it from the US standard. SEER (ESEER) values are calculated in Europe using Europe-specific load conditions, outdoor temperatures, and weightings, and SI units rather than BTU, making the numbers not directly comparable with those seen in the U.S.

The rest of this article discusses SEER as defined by the AHRI 210/240 standard.

== Example ==
For example, consider an air-conditioning unit with a cooling capacity of 5,000 BTU/h and a SEER of 10 BTU/Wh, operating for 8 hours daily during a 125-day annual cooling season (1,000 hours each year).

The annual total cooling output would be:

$$\frac{\mathrm{5,000~BTU}}{\mathrm{1~\cancel{h}}} \times \frac{\mathrm{8~\cancel{h}}}{\mathrm{1~\cancel{day}}} \times \frac{\mathrm{125~\cancel{day}}}{\mathrm{1~year}} = \mathrm{5,000,000~\frac{BTU}{year}}.$$

The annual electrical energy usage would be:

$$\frac{\mathrm{Annual~total~cooling~output}}{\mathrm{SEER}} = \frac{\mathrm{5,000,000~BTU}}{\mathrm{10~BTU~per~Wh}} = 500,000~\mathrm{Wh} = 500~\mathrm{kWh}$$

The average power usage may be calculated simply as:

$$\frac{\mathrm{Cooling~capacity}}{\mathrm{SEER}} = \frac{\mathrm{5,000~BTU~per~hour}}{\mathrm{10~BTU~per~Wh}} = 500~\mathrm{W} = 0.5~\mathrm{kW}$$

If the electricity cost is $0.20/(kW·h), then the cost per operating hour is:

$$0.5~\mathrm{kW} \times $0.20~\mathrm{per~kWh} = $0.10~\mathrm{per~hour}$$

== Relationship of SEER to EER and COP ==
The energy efficiency ratio (EER) of a particular cooling device is the ratio of output cooling energy (in BTUs) to input electrical energy (in watt-hours) at a given operating point. EER is generally calculated using a 95 °F (35 °C) outside temperature and an inside (actually return-air) temperature of 80 °F (27 °C) and 50% relative humidity.

The EER is related to the coefficient of performance (COP) commonly used in thermodynamics with both ratios expressing efficiency in terms of energy/energy. This means both are unit-less in the sense of dimensional analysis. As the EER uses mixed energy units — and COP does not — the conversion factor from watt-hours to BTU (1 W·h = 3.41214 BTU) is multiplied with the COP to obtain the EER as follows: EER = COP × 3.41214 BTU/W·h

The seasonal energy efficiency ratio (SEER) is also the COP (or EER) expressed in BTU/watt-hour, but instead of being evaluated at a single operating condition, it represents the expected overall performance for a typical year's weather in a given location. The SEER is thus calculated with the same indoor temperature, but over a range of outside temperatures from 65 °F (18 °C) to 104 °F (40 °C), with a certain specified percentage of time in each of 8 bins spanning 5 °F (2.8 °C). There is no allowance for different climates in this rating, which is intended to give an indication of how the EER is affected by a range of outside temperatures over the course of a cooling season.

Typical EER for residential central cooling units = 0.875 × SEER. SEER is a higher value than EER for the same equipment.

A more detailed method for converting SEER to EER uses this formula:

EER = −0.02 × SEER² + 1.12 × SEER Note that this method is used for benchmark modeling only and is not appropriate for all climate conditions.

A SEER of 13 is approximately equivalent to an EER of 11, and a COP of 3.2, which means that 3.2 units of heat are removed from indoors per unit of energy used to run the air conditioner.

== Theoretical maximum ==
The SEER and EER of an air conditioner are limited by the laws of thermodynamics. The refrigeration process with the maximum possible efficiency is the Carnot cycle. The COP of an air conditioner using the Carnot cycle is:

$$COP_{Carnot}=\frac{T_{C}}{T_{H}-T_{C}}$$

where $T_C$ is the indoor temperature and $T_H$ is the outdoor temperature. Both temperatures must be measured using a thermodynamic temperature scale based at absolute zero such as Kelvin or Rankine. The EER is calculated by multiplying the COP by 3.412 BTU/W⋅h as described above:

$$EER_{Carnot}=3.412 \frac{T_{C}}{T_{H}-T_{C}}$$

Assuming an outdoor temperature of 95 °F (35 °C) and an indoor temperature of 80 °F (27 °C), the above equation gives (when temperatures are converted to the Kelvin or Rankine scales) a COP of 36, or an EER of 120. This is about 10 times more efficient than a typical home air conditioner available today.

The maximum EER decreases as the difference between the inside and outside air temperature increases, and vice versa. In a desert climate where the outdoor temperature is 120 °F (49 °C), the maximum COP drops to 13, or an EER of 46 (for an indoor temperature of 80 °F (27 °C)).

The maximum SEER can be calculated by averaging the maximum EER over the range of expected temperatures for the season.

== US government SEER standards ==
SEER rating reflects overall system efficiency on a seasonal basis and EER reflects the system's energy efficiency at one specific operating condition. Both ratings are useful when choosing products, but the same rating must be used for comparisons.

Substantial energy savings can be obtained from more efficient systems. For example, by upgrading from SEER 9 to SEER 13, the power consumption is reduced by 30% (equal to 1 − 9/13).

With existing units that are still functional and well-maintained, when the time value of money is considered, retaining existing units rather than proactively replacing them may be the most cost effective. However, the efficiency of air conditioners can degrade significantly over time.

But when either replacing equipment, or specifying new installations, a variety of SEERs are available. For most applications, the minimum or near-minimum SEER units are most cost effective, but the longer the cooling seasons, the higher the electricity costs, and the longer the purchasers will own the systems, the more that incrementally higher SEER units are justified. Residential split-system AC units of SEER 20 or more are now available. The higher SEER units typically have larger coils and multiple compressors, with some also having variable refrigerant flow and variable supply air flow.

=== 1992 ===
In 1987 legislation taking effect in 1992 was passed requiring a minimum SEER rating of 10. It is rare to see systems rated below SEER 9 in the United States because aging, existing units are being replaced with new, higher efficiency units.

=== 2006 ===
Beginning in January 2006 a minimum SEER 13 was required. The United States requires that residential systems manufactured after 2005 have a minimum SEER rating of 13. ENERGY STAR qualified Central Air Conditioners must have a SEER of at least 14.5. Window units are exempt from this law so their SEERs are still around 10.

=== 2015 ===
In 2011 the US Department of Energy (DOE) revised energy conservation rules to impose elevated minimum standards and regional standards for residential HVAC systems. The regional approach recognizes the differences in cost-optimization resulting from regional climate differences. For example, there is little cost benefit in having a very high SEER air conditioning unit in Maine, a state in the northeast US.

Starting January 1, 2015, split-system central air conditioners installed in the Southeastern Region of the US must be at least 14 SEER. The Southeastern Region includes Alabama, Arkansas, Delaware, Florida, Georgia, Hawaii, Kentucky, Louisiana, Maryland, Mississippi, North Carolina, Oklahoma, South Carolina, Tennessee, Texas, and Virginia. Similarly, split-system central air conditioners installed in the Southwestern Region must be a minimum 14 SEER and 12.2 EER beginning on January 1, 2015. The Southwestern Region consists of Arizona, California, Nevada, and New Mexico. Split-system central air conditioners installed in all other regions must continue to be a minimum of 13 SEER, which is the current national requirement.

There have been many new advances in efficient technology over the past 10 years which have enabled manufacturers to increase their SEER ratings dramatically in order to stay above the required minimums set by the United States department of energy.

=== 2023 ===
Effective January 1, 2023, cooling products will be subject to regional minimum efficiencies, according to Seasonal Energy Efficiency Ratio 2 (SEER2). The new M1 testing procedure is designed to better reflect current field conditions. DOE increases systems' external static pressure from current SEER (0.1 in. of water) to SEER2 (0.5 in. of water). These pressure conditions were devised to consider ducted systems that would be seen in the field. With this change, new nomenclature will be used to denote M1 ratings (including EER2 and HSPF2).

New Minimum with M1 Ratings
Split System	Region		
Split System	North	Southwest	Southeast
AC < 45000 BTU/h	13.4 SEER2	14.3 SEER2 / 11.7 EER2	14.3 SEER2
AC ≥ 45000 BTU/h	13.4 SEER2	13.8 SEER2 / 11.2 EER2	13.8 SEER2

== Calculating the annual cost of electric energy for an air conditioner ==
Electric power is usually measured in kilowatts (kW). Electric energy is usually measured in kilowatt-hours (kW·h). For example, if an electric load that draws 1.5 kW of electric power is operated for 8 hours, it uses 12 kW·h of electric energy. In the United States, a residential electric customer is charged based on the amount of electric energy used. On the customer bill, the electric utility states the amount of electric energy, in kilowatt-hours (kW·h), that the customer used since the last bill, and the cost of the energy per kilowatt-hour (kW·h).

Air-conditioner sizes are often given as "tons" of cooling, where 1 ton of cooling equals 12,000 BTU/h (3.5 kW). 1 ton of cooling equals the amount of power that needs to be applied continuously over a 24-hour period to melt 1 ton of ice.

The annual cost of electric energy consumed by an air conditioner may be calculated as follows:

(Cost, $/year) = (unit size, BTU/h) × (hours per year, h) × (energy cost, $/kW·h) ÷ (SEER, BTU/W·h) ÷ (1000, W/kW)

Example 1:

An air-conditioning unit rated at 72,000 BTU/h (21 kW) (6 tons), with a SEER rating of 10, operates 1000 hours per year at an electric energy cost of $0.12 per kilowatt-hour (kW·h). What is the annual cost of the electric energy it uses?

(72,000 BTU/h) × (1000 h/year) × ($0.12/kW·h) ÷ (10 BTU/W·h) ÷ (1000 W/kW) = $860/year

Example 2.

A residence near Chicago has an air conditioner with a cooling capacity of 4 tons and an SEER rating of 10. The unit is operated 120 days each year for 8 hours per day (960 hours per year), and the electric energy cost is $0.10 per kilowatt-hour. What is its annual cost of operation in terms of electric energy? First, we convert tons of cooling to BTU/h:

(4 tons) × (12,000 (BTU/h)/ton) = 48,000 BTU/h.

The annual cost of the electric energy is:

(48,000 BTU/h) × (960 h/year) × ($0.10/kW·h) ÷ (10 BTU/W·h) ÷ (1000 W/kW) = $460/year

== Maximum SEER ratings ==
Today there are mini-split (ductless) air conditioner units available with SEER ratings up to 42. During the 2014 AHR Expo, Mitsubishi unveiled a new mini-split ductless AC unit with a SEER rating of 30.5. GREE also released a 30.5 SEER rating mini split in 2015 as well. Carrier launched a 42 SEER ductless air conditioner during 2018 Consumer electronic Show (CES), held in Las Vegas. Traditional AC systems with ducts have maximum SEER ratings slightly below these levels. Also, practically, central systems will have an achieved energy efficiency ratio 10–20% lower than the nameplate rating due to the duct-related losses.

Additionally, there are ground-source residential AC units with SEER ratings up to 75. However, ground-source heat pump effective efficiency is reliant on the temperature of the ground or water source used. Hot climates have a much higher ground or surface water temperature than cold climates and therefore will not be able to achieve such efficiencies. Moreover, the ARI rating scheme for ground-source heat pumps allows them to largely ignore required pump power in their ratings, making the achievable SEER values often practically lower than the highest efficiency air-source equipment—particularly for air cooling. There are a variety of technologies that will allow SEER and EER ratings to increase further in the near future. Some of these technologies include rotary compressors, inverters, DC brushless motors, variable-speed drives, and integrated systems such as those found in solar-powered air conditioning.

== Heat pumps ==
A refrigeration cycle can be operated as a heat pump to move heat from outdoors into a warmer house. A heat pump with a higher SEER rating for cooling mode would also usually be more efficient in heating mode, rated using HSPF. When operated in heating mode, a heat pump is typically more efficient than an electrical resistance heater. This is because a space heater can convert only the input electrical energy directly to output heat energy, while a heat pump transfers heat from outdoors. In heating mode, the coefficient of performance is the ratio of heat provided to the energy used by the unit. An ideal resistance heater converting 100% of its input electricity to output heat would have COP = 1, equivalent to a 3.4 EER. The heat pump becomes less efficient as the outside temperature decreases, and its performance may become comparable to a resistance heater. For a heat pump with the minimum 13 SEER cooling efficiency, this is typically below −10 °F (−23 °C).

Lower temperatures may cause a heat pump to operate below the efficiency of a resistance heater, so conventional heat pumps often include heater coils or auxiliary heating from LP or natural gas to prevent low efficiency operation of the refrigeration cycle. "Cold climate" heat pumps are designed to optimize efficiency below 0 °F (−18 °C). As of 2023 heat pumps are marketed that will extract heat from outdoor temperatures as low as −40 °F (−40 °C). In the case of cold climates, water or ground-source heat pumps are often the most efficient solution. They use the relatively constant temperature of ground water or of water in a large buried loop to moderate the temperature differences in summer and winter and improve performance year round. The heat pump cycle is reversed in the summer to act as an air conditioner.

== See also ==
- Air conditioner
- Air conditioning
- Annual fuel use efficiency (AFUE)
- Coefficient of performance
- Energy star
- Heat pump
- HSPF
- HVAC
- Thermal efficiency
