= Air source heat pump =

Most common type of heat pump

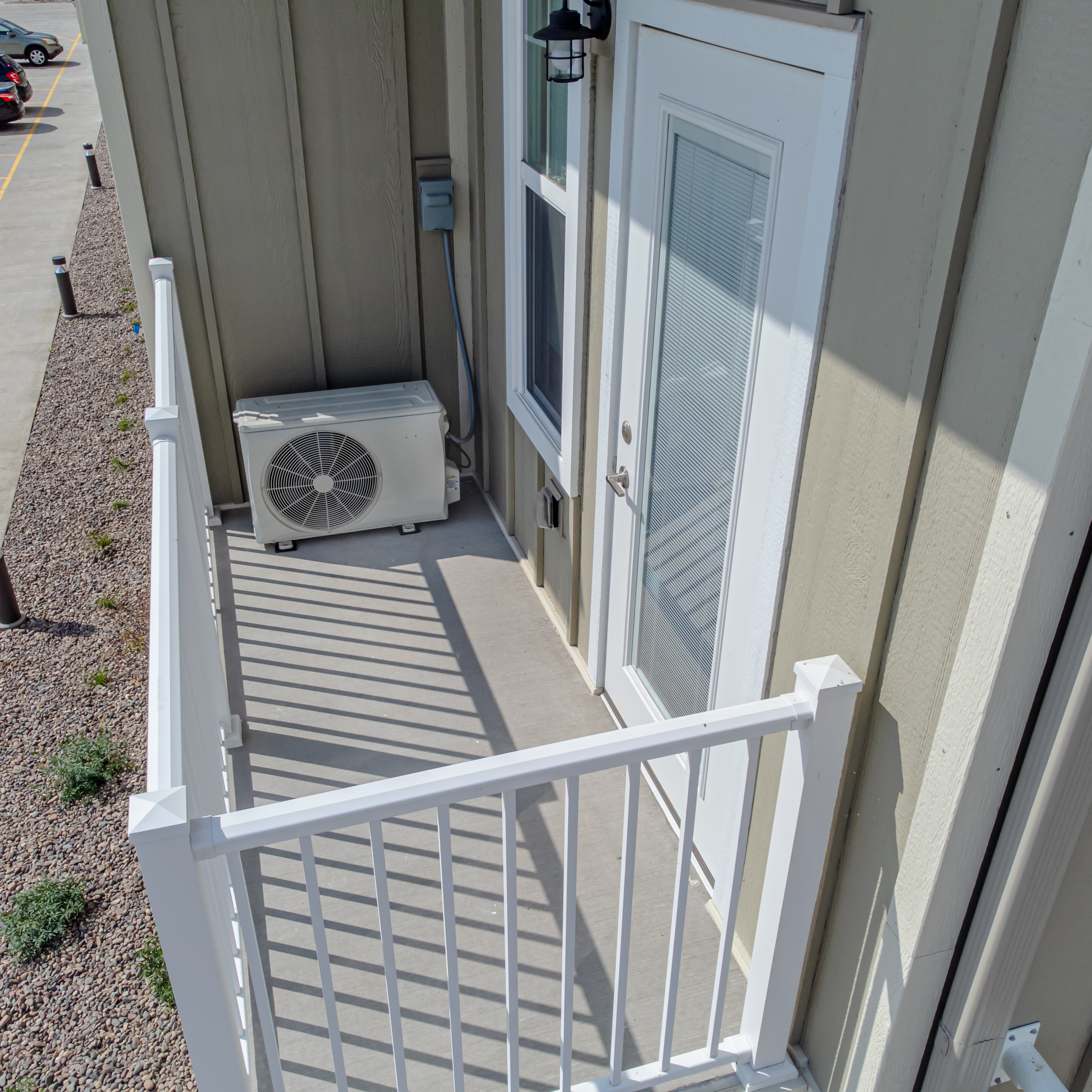
Heat pump on balcony of apartment

An air source heat pump (ASHP), the most common type (Note: Water or ground source heat pumps are the other type of heat pump, the water either taken from streams, or circulating as brine in the ground) of heat pump, can absorb energy (heat) sourced from cold ambient air outside a building, and release the energy at a higher temperature to heat the building, either via hot air or hot water. Electricity powers the mechanical pump (compressor), the used electric energy providing typically 3 or 4 times more pumped thermal energy than simple resistive Joule heating.

Heat pumps use the same vapor-compression refrigeration process and much the same equipment as an air conditioner, but in the opposite direction, or rather source and target can be exchanged, vice versa. With ambient air accessible nearly everywhere, ASHPs are the most common type of heat pump and, usually being small, tend to be used to heat individual houses or flats rather than blocks, districts or industrial processes.

Air-to-air heat pumps provide hot or cold air directly to single rooms, but do not usually provide hot water. Air-to-water heat pumps use water pipes and radiators or underfloor heating to heat a whole house and are often also used to provide domestic hot water.

An ASHP can typically gain 4 kWh thermal energy from 1 kWh electric energy, thus its coefficient of performance or COP is 4. They are optimized for flow temperatures between 30 and 40 °C (86 and 104 °F), suitable for buildings with heat emitters sized for low flow temperatures. With losses in efficiency, an ASHP can even provide full central heating with a flow temperature up to 80 °C (176 °F).

As of 2023 about 10% of building heating worldwide is from ASHPs. They are the main way to phase out gas boilers and furnaces from houses, to avoid their greenhouse gas emissions.

Air-source heat pumps are used to move heat between two heat exchangers, one outside the building which is fitted with fins through which air is forced using a fan and the other which either directly heats the air inside the building or heats water which is then circulated around the building through radiators or underfloor heating which releases the heat to the building. These devices can also operate in a cooling mode where they extract heat via the internal heat exchanger and eject it into the ambient air using the external heat exchanger. Some can be used to heat water for washing which is stored in a domestic hot water tank.

Air-source heat pumps are relatively easy and inexpensive to install, so are the most widely used type. In mild weather, coefficient of performance (COP) may be between 2 and 5, while at temperatures below around −8 °C (18 °F) an air-source heat pump may still achieve a COP of 1 to 4.

While older air-source heat pumps performed relatively poorly at low temperatures and were better suited for warm climates, newer models with variable-speed compressors remain highly efficient in freezing conditions allowing for wide adoption and cost savings in places like Minnesota and Maine in the United States.

In Europe, the boycott of Russian gas has accelerated the shift toward alternatives. If 14 million were to switch to heat pumps, consumption could be reduced by 13 billion cubic metres. Heat pumps are up to five times more energy-efficient than conventional boilers, and in the UK, HVAC are now about 27 percent cheaper to operate than gas boilers.

== Technology ==
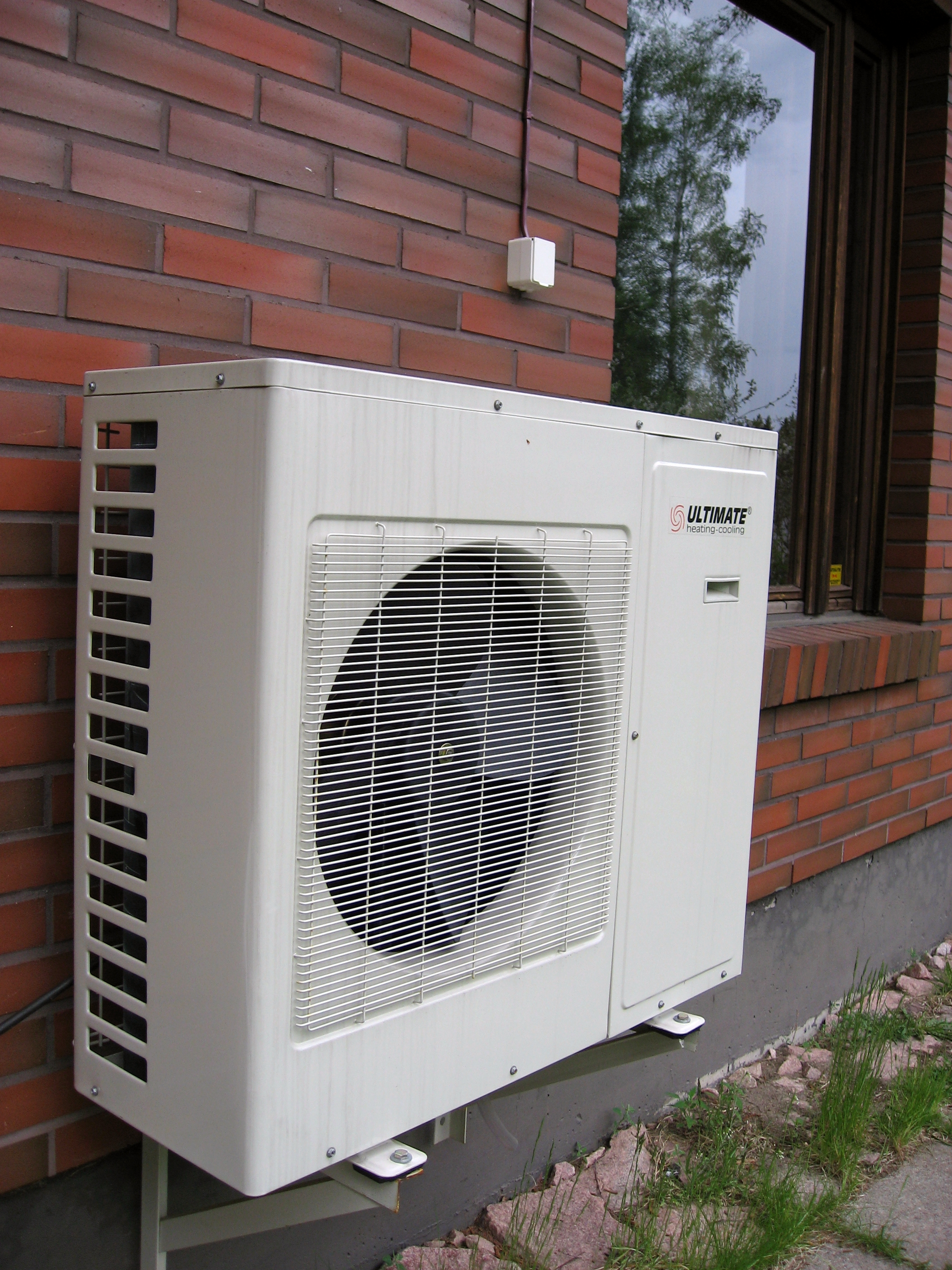
Air source heat pump

Air at any natural temperature contains some heat. An air source heat pump transfers some of this from one place to another, for example between the outside and inside of a building.

An air-to-air system can be designed to transfer heat in either direction, to heat the interior of a building in winter and cool it in summer. Internal ducting may be used to distribute the air. An air-to-water system only pumps heat inwards, and can provide space heating and hot water. The description below focuses on use for interior heating.

The technology is similar to a refrigerator or freezer or air conditioning unit; the different effect is due to the location of the different system components. Just as the pipes on the back of a refrigerator become warm as the interior cools, so an ASHP warms the inside of a building whilst cooling the outside air.

The main components of a split-system (called split as there are two units, set up inside and outside) air source heat pump are:

- An outdoor evaporator heat exchanger coil, which extracts heat from ambient air
- Pipes with refrigerant fluid/gas connecting the units
- One or more indoor condenser heat exchanger coils. They transfer the heat into the indoor air, or an indoor heating system such as water-filled radiators or underfloor circuits and a domestic hot water tank.

Less commonly a packaged (single unit or monobloc) ASHP has everything outside in one box, with hot (or cold) air sent inside through a duct These are also called monobloc; they keep flammable propane outside the house. or via water pipes.

An ASHP can provide three or four times (COP 4) as much heat as an electric resistance heater for the same amount of electric energy. Burning gas or oil emits carbon dioxide and also NOx, which can be harmful to health. An air source heat pump itself does not issue carbon dioxide, nitrogen oxide or any other kind of gas, but emissions may occur where the electricity is generated. It uses a small amount of electrical energy to transfer (pump) a significantly larger amount of heat energy.

Most ASHPs are reversible and are able to either warm or cool buildings and in some cases also provide domestic hot water. The use of an air-to-water heat pump for house cooling has been criticised as being not designed for that purpose and thus not powerful enough.

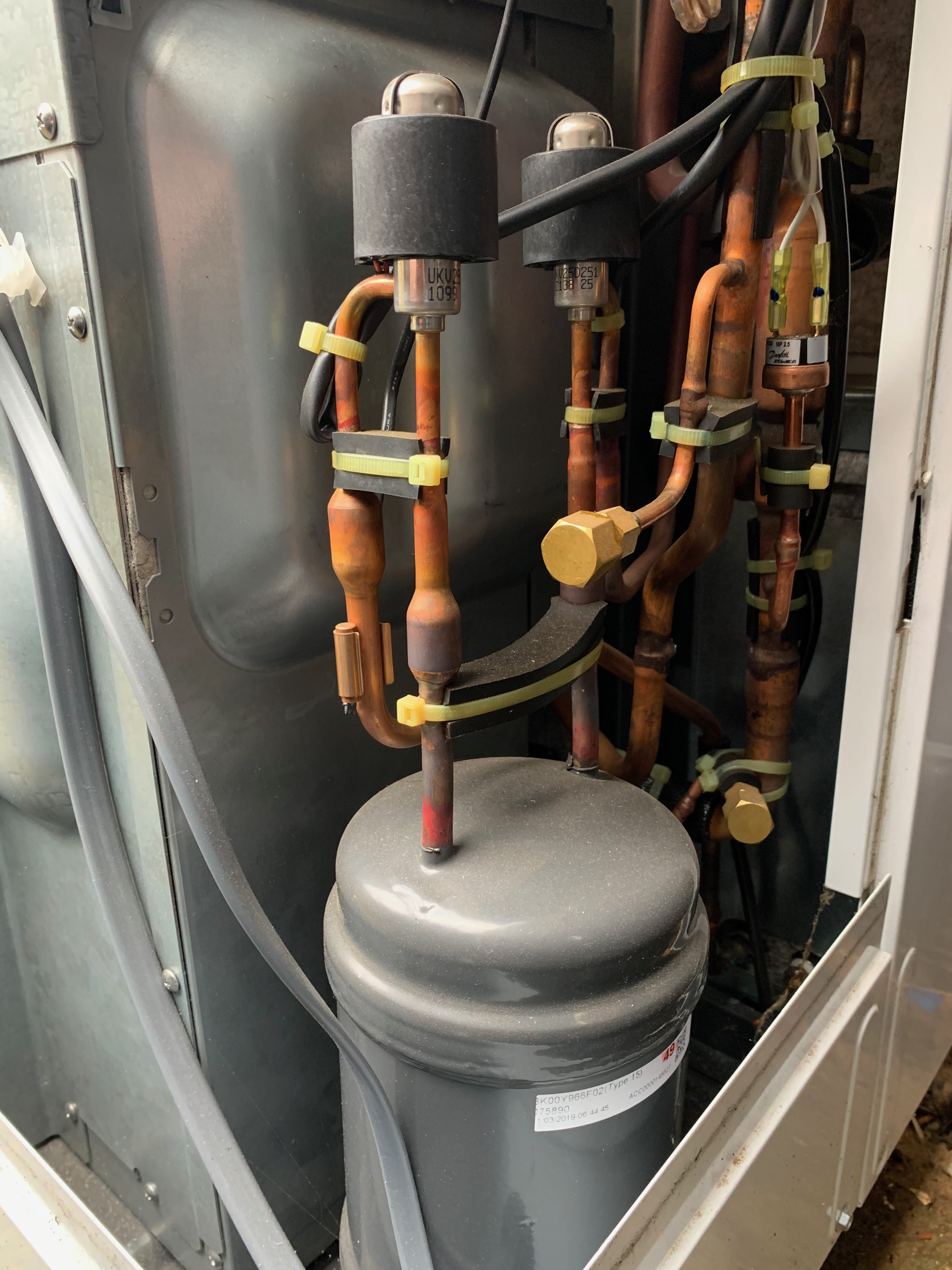
An internal view of the outdoor unit of an air source heat pump

A: indoor compartment, B: outdoor compartment, I: insulation, 1: condenser, 2: expansion valve, 3: evaporator, 4: compressor

Heating and cooling is accomplished by pumping a refrigerant through the heat pump's indoor and outdoor coils. Like in a refrigerator, a compressor, condenser, expansion valve and evaporator are used to change states of the refrigerant between colder liquid and hotter gas states.

When the liquid refrigerant at a low temperature and low pressure passes through the outdoor heat exchanger coils, ambient heat causes the liquid to boil (change to gas or vapor). Heat energy from the outside air has been absorbed and stored in the refrigerant as latent heat. The gas is then compressed using an electric pump; the compression increases the temperature of the gas.

Inside the building, the gas passes through a pressure valve into heat exchanger coils. There, the hot refrigerant gas condenses back to a liquid and transfers the stored latent heat to the indoor air, water heating or hot water system. The indoor air or heating water is pumped across the heat exchanger by an electric pump or fan.

The cool liquid refrigerant then re-enters the outdoor heat exchanger coils to begin a new cycle. Each cycle usually takes a few minutes.

Most heat pumps can also operate in a cooling mode where the cold refrigerant is moved through the indoor coils to cool the room air.

As of 2024 vapour compression is the only technology significant in the market.

== Usage ==
ASHPs are the most common type of heat pump and, usually being smaller, are generally more suitable to heat individual houses rather than blocks of flats, compact urban districts or industrial processes. In dense city centres heat networks may be better than ASHP. Air source heat pumps are used to provide interior space heating and cooling even in colder climates, and can be used efficiently for water heating in milder climates. A major advantage of some ASHPs is that the same system may be used for heating in winter and cooling in summer. Though the cost of installation is generally high, it is less than the cost of a ground source heat pump, because a ground source heat pump requires excavation to install its ground loop. The advantage of a ground source heat pump is that it has access to the thermal storage capacity of the ground which allows it to produce more heat for less electricity in cold conditions.

Home batteries can mitigate the risk of power cuts and like ASHPs are becoming more popular. Some ASHPs can be coupled to solar panels as primary energy source, with a conventional electric grid as backup source.

Thermal storage solutions incorporating resistance heating can be used in conjunction with ASHPs. Storage may be more cost-effective if time of use electricity rates are available. Heat is stored in high density ceramic bricks contained within a thermally-insulated enclosure; storage heaters are an example. ASHPs may also be paired with passive solar heating. Thermal mass (such as concrete or rocks) heated by passive solar heat can help stabilize indoor temperatures, absorbing heat during the day and releasing heat at night, when outdoor temperatures are colder and heat pump efficiency is lower.

=== Replacing gas heating in existing houses ===
Good home insulation is important. As of 2023 ASHPs are bigger than gas boilers and need more space outside, so the process is more complex and can be more expensive than if it was possible to just remove a gas boiler and install an ASHP in its place. If running costs are important choosing the right size is important because an ASHP which is too large will be more expensive to run.

It can be more complicated to retrofit conventional heating systems that use radiators/radiant panels, hot water baseboard heaters, or even smaller diameter ducting, with ASHP-sourced heat. The lower heat pump output temperatures means radiators (and possibly pipes) may have to be replaced with larger sizes, or a low temperature underfloor heating system installed instead.

Alternatively, a high temperature heat pump can be installed and existing heat emitters can be retained, however as of 2023 these heat pumps are more expensive to buy and run so may only be suitable for buildings which are hard to alter or insulate, such as some large historic houses.

ASHP are claimed to be healthier than fossil-fuelled heating such as gas heaters by maintaining a more even temperature and avoiding harmful fumes risk. By filtering the air and reducing humidity in hot humid summer climates, they are also said to reduce dust, allergens, and mold, which poses a health risk.

=== In cold climates ===
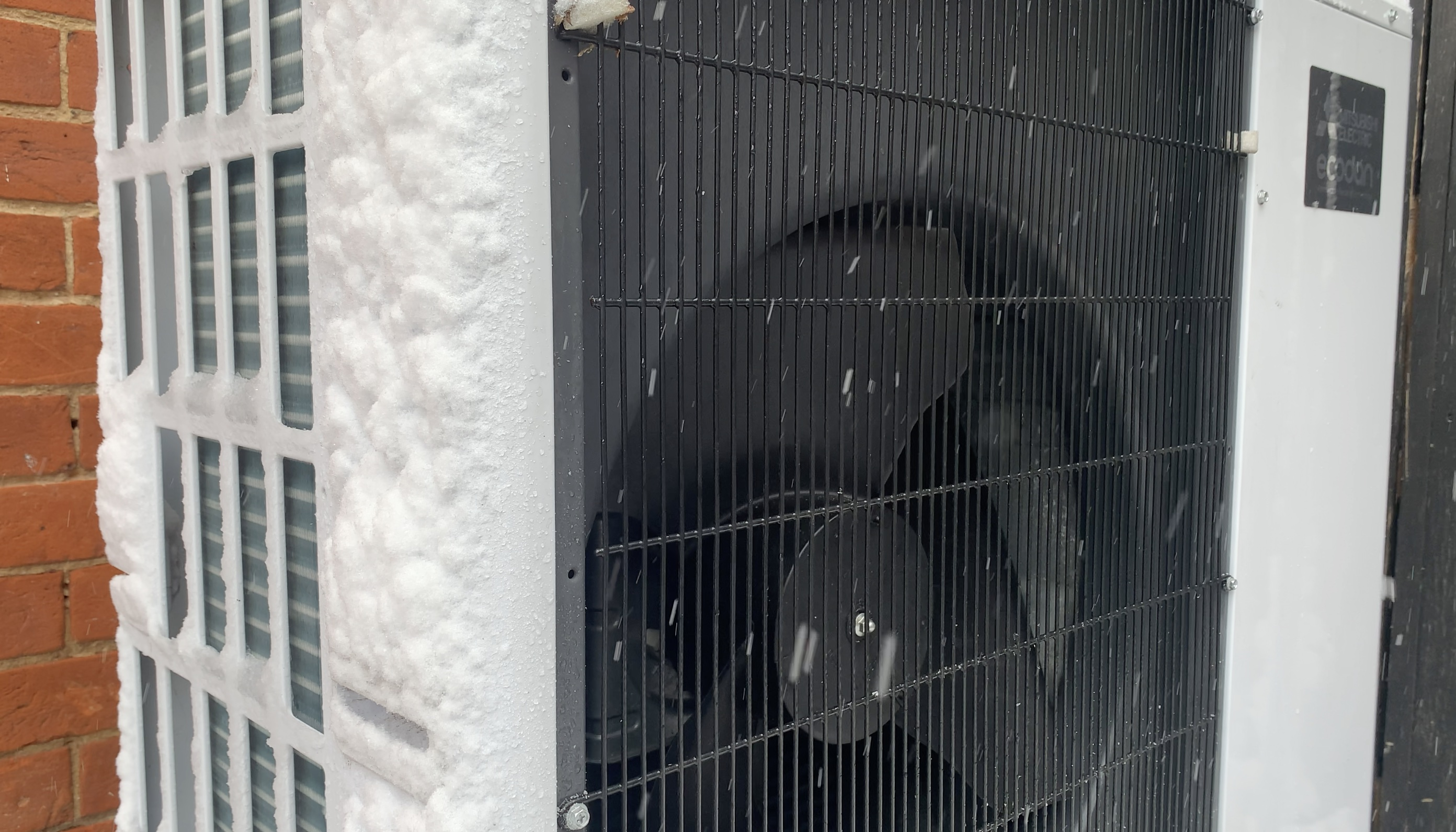
The outdoor unit of an air source heat pump operating in freezing conditions

Operation of normal ASHPs is generally not recommended below −10 °C. However, ASHPs designed specifically for very cold climates (certified in the US under Energy Star) can extract useful heat from ambient air as cold as −30 °C (−22 °F) but electric resistance heating may be more efficient below −25 °C. This is made possible by the use of variable-speed compressors, powered by inverters. Although air source heat pumps are less efficient than well-installed ground source heat pumps (GSHPs) in cold conditions, air source heat pumps have lower initial costs and may be the most economical or practical choice. A hybrid system, with both a heat pump and an alternative source of heat such as a fossil fuel boiler, may be suitable if it is impractical to properly insulate a large house. Alternatively multiple heat pumps or a high temperature heat pump may be considered.

In some weather conditions condensation will form and then freeze onto the coils of the heat exchanger of the outdoor unit, reducing air flow through the coils. To clear this condensation, the unit operates a defrost cycle, switching to cooling mode for a few minutes and heating the coils until the ice melts. Air-to-water heat pumps use heat from the circulating water for this purpose, which results in a small and probably undetectable drop in water temperature; for air-to-air systems, heat is either taken from the air in the building or using an electrical heater. Some air-to-air systems simply stop the operation of the fans of both units and switch to cooling mode so that the outdoor unit returns to being the condenser so that it heats up and defrosts.

As discussed above, typical air-source heat pumps (ASHPs) struggle to perform efficiently at low temperatures. Ground-source heat pumps (GSHPs), which transfer heat to or from the ground using fluid-filled underground pipes (ground heat exchangers or GHEs), are more efficient, but labor and material installation costs are higher. A ground source air heat pump (GSAHP)—or water-to-refrigerant type GSHPs —presents a viable alternative, integrating elements of ASHPs and water-to-water GSHPs. A GSAHP has three components: a GHE (vertical or horizontal), a heat pump, and a fan coil unit (FCU).

The heat pump unit contains an evaporator, compressor, condenser, and expansion valve. Thermal energy is extracted from the ground through an antifreeze solution in the GHE, transferred to the refrigerant in the heat pump, and compressed before being delivered to a refrigerant-to-air heat exchanger. A fan then circulates the heated air indoors.

Unlike conventional GSHPs, GSAHPs eliminate the need for hydronic systems (e.g., underfloor heating systems or wall-mounted radiators), using fans to distribute heat directly into indoor air. This reduces installation costs and complexity while retaining the efficiency benefits of GSHPs in cold climates. By extracting heat from stable ground temperatures, GSAHPs are more efficient than ASHPs at low temperatures, and emit less greenhouse gases. Installation costs for GSAHPs are intermediate between ASHP and GSHP systems; while they eliminate the need for indoor pipework, they require drilling or digging for the GHE.

Electricity consumption drives the climate impact of heat pump systems. GSAHPs demonstrate a coefficient of performance (COP) approximately 35% higher than ASHPs under certain conditions, due to the stable ground temperatures they leverage. Additionally, the operation phase accounts for 84% of its climate impacts over a heat pump's life cycle, highlighting the importance of efficiency (i.e., higher COPs) in reducing emissions. The global warming potential (GWP) of GSAHPs is nearly 40% lower than ASHPs, further demonstrating their environmental advantages in cold climates. This efficiency advantage is especially pronounced during winter when ASHP efficiency typically declines. GSAHPs consume less electricity for heating, reducing greenhouse gas emissions, particularly in regions with high heating demands and carbon-intensive electricity grids.

=== Noise ===
An air source heat pump requires an outdoor unit containing moving mechanical components including fans which produce noise. Modern devices offer schedules for silent mode operation with reduced fan speed. This will reduce the maximum heating power but can be applied at mild outdoor temperatures without efficiency loss. Acoustic enclosures are another approach to reduce the noise in a sensitive neighbourhood. In insulated buildings, operation can be paused at night without significant temperature loss. Only at low temperatures, frost protection forces operation after a few hours. Proper siting is also important.

In the United States, the allowed night-time noise level is 45 A-weighted decibels (dBA). In the UK the limit is set at 42 dB measured from the nearest neighbour according to the MCS 020 standard or equivalent. In Germany the limit in residential areas is 35, which is usually measured by European Standard EN 12102.

Another feature of air source heat pumps (ASHPs) external heat exchangers is their need to stop the fan from time to time for a period of several minutes in order to get rid of frost that accumulates in the outdoor unit in the heating mode. After that, the heat pump starts to work again. This part of the work cycle results in two sudden changes of the noise made by the fan. The acoustic effect of such disruption is especially powerful in quiet environments where background night-time noise may be as low as 0 to 10dBA. This is included in legislation in France. According to the French concept of noise nuisance, "noise emergence" is the difference between ambient noise including the disturbing noise, and ambient noise without the disturbing noise. By contrast a ground source heat pump has no need for an outdoor unit with moving mechanical components.

== Efficiency ratings ==
The efficiency of air source heat pumps is measured by the coefficient of performance (COP). A COP of 4 means the heat pump produces 4 units of heat energy for every 1 unit of electricity it consumes. Within temperature ranges of −3 °C (27 °F) to 10 °C (50 °F), the COP for many machines is fairly stable. Approximately TheoreticalMaxCOP = (desiredIndoorTempC + 273) ÷ (desiredIndoorTempC - outsideTempC).

In mild weather with an outside temperature of 10 °C (50 °F), the COP of efficient air source heat pumps ranges from 4 to 6. However, on a cold winter day, it takes more work to move the same amount of heat indoors than on a mild day. The heat pump's performance is limited by the Carnot cycle and will approach 1.0 as the outdoor-to-indoor temperature difference increases, which for most air source heat pumps happens as outdoor temperatures approach −18 °C (0 °F).Heat pump construction that enables carbon dioxide as a refrigerant may have a COP of greater than 2 even down to −20 °C, pushing the break-even figure downward to −30 °C (−22 °F). A ground source heat pump has comparatively less of a change in COP as outdoor temperatures change, because the ground from which they extract heat has a more constant temperature than outdoor air.

The design of a heat pump has a considerable impact on its efficiency. Many air source heat pumps are designed primarily as air conditioning units, mainly for use in summer temperatures. Designing a heat pump specifically for the purpose of heat exchange can attain greater COP and an extended life cycle. The principal changes are in the scale and type of compressor and evaporator.

Seasonally adjusted heating and cooling efficiencies are given by the heating seasonal performance factor (HSPF) and seasonal energy efficiency ratio (SEER) respectively. In the US the legal minimum efficiency is 14 or 15 SEER and 8.8 HSPF.

Variable speed compressors are more efficient because they can often run more slowly and because the air passes through more slowly giving its water more time to condense, thus more efficient as drier air is easier to cool. However, they are more expensive and more likely to need maintenance or replacement. Maintenance such as changing filters can improve performance by 10% to 25%.

== Refrigerant types ==
Pure refrigerants can be divided into organic substances (hydrocarbons (HCs), chlorofluorocarbons (CFCs), hydrochlorofluorocarbons (HCFCs), hydrofluorocarbons (HFCs), Hydrofluoroolefins (HFOs), and HCFOs), and inorganic substances (ammonia (NH_{3}), carbon dioxide (CO_{2}), and water (H_{2}O)). Their boiling points are usually below −25 °C.

In the past 200 years, the standards and requirements for new refrigerants have changed. Nowadays, low global warming potential (GWP) is required, in addition to the previous requirements for safety, practicality, material compatibility, appropriate atmospheric life, and compatibility with high-efficiency products. By 2022, devices using refrigerants with a very low GWP have a small market share but are expected to play an increasing role due to enforced regulations, as most countries have now ratified the Kigali Amendment to ban HFCs. Isobutane (R600A) and propane (R290) are less harmful to the environment than conventional hydrofluorocarbons (HFC) and are already being used in air-source heat pumps. Propane may be the most suitable for high temperature heat pumps. Ammonia (R717) and carbon dioxide (R-744) also have a low GWP. As of 2023, smaller CO_{2} heat pumps are not widely available and research and development of them continues. A 2024 report said that refrigerants with GWP are vulnerable to further international restrictions.

Until the 1990s, heat pumps, along with refrigerators and other related products used chlorofluorocarbons (CFCs) as refrigerants, which caused major damage to the ozone layer when released into the atmosphere. Use of these chemicals was banned or severely restricted by the Montreal Protocol of August 1987.

Replacements, including R-134a and R-410A, are hydrofluorocarbons (HFC) with similar thermodynamic properties with insignificant ozone depletion potential (ODP) but had problematic GWP. HFCs are powerful greenhouse gases which contribute to climate change. Dimethyl ether (DME) also gained in popularity as a refrigerant in combination with R404a. More recent refrigerants include difluoromethane (R32) with a lower GWP, but still over 600.

refrigerant	20-year GWP	100-year GWP
R-290 propane	0.072	0.02
R-600a isobutane		3
R-32	491	771
R-410a	4705	2285
R-134a	4060	1470
R-404a	7258	4808

Devices with R-290 refrigerant (propane) are expected to play a key role in the future. The 100-year GWP of propane, at 0.02, is extremely low and is approximately 7000 times less than R-32. However, the flammability of propane requires additional safety measures: the maximum safe charges have been set significantly lower than for lower flammability refrigerants (only allowing approximately 13.5 times less refrigerant in the system than R-32). This means that R-290 is not suitable for all situations or locations. Nonetheless, by 2022, an increasing number of devices with R-290 were offered for domestic use, especially in Europe.

However, HFC refrigerants still dominate the market. Recent government mandates have seen the phase-out of R-22 refrigerant. Replacements such as R-32 and R-410A are being promoted as environmentally friendly but still have a high GWP. A heat pump typically uses 3 kg of refrigerant. With R-32 this amount still has a 20-year impact equivalent to 7 tons of CO_{2}, which corresponds to two years of natural gas heating in an average household. Refrigerants with a high ODP have already been phased out.

== Impact on decarbonization and electricity supply ==
Heat pumps are key to decarbonizing home energy use by phasing out gas boilers. As of 2024 the International Energy Agency (IEA) says that 500 million tonnes of CO_{2} emissions could be cut by 2030.

As wind farms are increasingly used to supply electricity to some grids, such as Canada's Yukon Territory, the increased winter load matches well with the increased winter generation from wind turbines, and calmer days result in decreased heating load for most houses even if the air temperature is low.

Heat pumps could help stabilize grids through demand response. As heat pump penetration increases, some countries, such as the UK, may need to encourage households to use thermal energy storage, such as very well insulated water tanks. In some countries, such as Australia, integration of this thermal storage with rooftop solar would also help.

Although higher cost heat pumps can be more efficient a 2024 study concluded that for the UK "from an energy system perspective, it is overall cost-optimal to design heat pumps with nominal COP in the range of 2.8–3.2, which typically has a specific cost lower than 650 £/kWth, and simultaneously to invest in increased capacities of renewable energy generation technologies and batteries, in the first instance, followed by OCGT and CCGT with CCS."

== Economics ==
=== Cost ===
As of 2023 buying and installing an ASHP in an existing house is expensive if there is no government subsidy, but the lifetime cost will likely be less than or similar to a gas boiler and air conditioner. This is generally also true if cooling is not required, as the ASHP will likely last longer if only heating. The lifetime cost of an air source heat pump will be affected by the price of electricity compared to gas (where available), and may take two to ten years to break even. The IEA recommends governments subsidize the purchase price of residential heat pumps, and some countries do so.

=== Market ===
In Norway, Australia and New Zealand most heating is from heat pumps. In 2022 heat pumps outsold fossil fuel based heating in the US and France. In the UK, annual heat pump sales have steadily grown in recent years with 26,725 heat pumps sold in 2018, a figure which has increased to 60,244 heat pumps sales in 2023. ASHPs can be helped to compete by increasing the price of fossil gas compared to that of electricity and using suitable flexible electricity pricing. In the US air-to-air is the most common type. As of 2023 over 80% of heat pumps are air source. In 2023 the IEA appealed for better data - especially on air-to-air.

== Maintenance and reliability ==
Many of the maintenance needs for air source heat pumps reflect that of conventional air conditioning and furnace installations, such as regular air filter replacements and cleaning of both the indoor evaporator and outdoor condenser coils. However, there are additional maintenance measures unique to the operation of air source heat pumps that concern the physical means by which a heat pump extracts heat from the outdoor air. Since a heat pump running in cooling mode operates essentially the same as a conventional air conditioning system, these measures primarily concern the performance of ASHPs during the winter, especially in colder climates.

In colder climates, where the compressor works harder to extract heat from the outside air, it is critical to prevent the buildup of ice and frost on the outdoor coil to maintain ASHP performance. This buildup acts as an insulation layer and decreases the rate of heat exchange by blocking the continuous flow of air over the outdoor coil. To prevent this issue, it is necessary to keep the outdoor coil clean of any dirt or grime, as this can trap moisture from the air, which freezes over the coil. In addition, it is necessary to keep the fins surrounding the condenser coil and air intake grill of the outdoor unit free of any debris, such as leaves, that could further block airflow and impede heat exchange. This upkeep helps minimize the need for frequent defrost cycles that put the heat pump into cooling mode and send heated refrigerant to the condenser coil to melt accumulated ice. These defrost cycles can cause pressure fluctuations in the refrigerant lines that lead to refrigerant leaks and diminish performance.

When heating performance drops, an ASHP can remain reliable through its auxiliary heating strip that provides an additional source of heat through electrical resistance to compensate for any heat losses, although this process is significantly less efficient.

It is thought that ASHP need less maintenance than fossil fuelled heating, and some say that ASHPs are easier to maintain than ground source heat pumps due to the difficulty of finding and fixing underground leaks. Installing too small an ASHP could shorten its lifetime (but one which is too large will be less efficient). However others say that boilers require less maintenance than ASHPs. A Consumer Reports survey found that "on average, around half of heat pumps are likely to experience problems by the end of the eighth year of ownership".

== History ==
Modern chemical refrigeration techniques developed after the proposal of the Carnot cycle in 1824. Jacob Perkins invented an ice-making machine that used ether in 1843, and Edmond Carré built a refrigerator that used water and sulfuric acid in 1850. In Japan, Fusanosuke Kuhara, founder of Hitachi, Ltd., made an air conditioner for his own home use using compressed CO_{2} as a refrigerant in 1917.

In 1930 Thomas Midgley Jr. discovered dichlorodifluoromethane, a chlorinated fluorocarbon (CFC) known as freon. CFCs rapidly replaced traditional refrigerant substances, including CO_{2} (which proved hard to compress for domestic use), for use in heat pumps and refrigerators. But from the 1980s CFCs began to lose favor as refrigerant when their damaging effects on the ozone layer were discovered. Two alternative types of refrigerant, hydrofluorocarbons (HFCs) and hydrochlorofluorocarbons (HCFCs), also lost favor when they were identified as greenhouse gases (additionally, HCFCs were found to be more damaging to the ozone layer than originally thought). The Vienna Convention for the Protection of the Ozone Layer, the Montreal Protocol and the Kyoto Protocol call for the complete abandonment of such refrigerants by 2030.

In 1989, amid international concern about the effects of chlorofluorocarbons and hydrochlorofluorocarbons on the ozone layer, scientist Gustav Lorentzen and SINTEF patented a method for using CO_{2} as a refrigerant in heating and cooling. Further research into CO_{2} refrigeration was then conducted at Shecco (Sustainable HEating and Cooling with CO_{2}) in Brussels, Belgium, leading to increasing use of CO_{2} refrigerant technology in Europe.

In 1993 the Japanese company Denso, in collaboration with Gustav Lorentzen, developed an automobile air conditioner using CO_{2} as a refrigerant. They demonstrated the invention at the June 1998 International Institute of Refrigeration/Gustav Lorentzen Conference. After the conference, CRIEPI (Central Research Institute of Electric Power Industry) and TEPCO (The Tokyo Electric Power Company) approached Denso about developing a prototype air conditioner using natural refrigerant materials instead of freon. Together they produced 30 prototype units for a year-long experimental installation at locations throughout Japan, from the cold climate of Hokkaidō to hotter Okinawa. After this successful feasibility study, Denso obtained a patent to compress CO_{2} refrigerant for use in a heat pump from SINTEF in September 2000. During the early 21st century CO_{2} heat pumps, under the EcoCute patent, became popular for new-build housing in Japan but were slower to take off elsewhere.

== Manufacturing ==
Demand for heat pumps increased in the first quarter of the 21st century in the US and Europe, with governments subsidizing them to increase energy security and decarbonisation. Europeans tend to use air-to-water (also called hydronic) systems which utilize radiators, rather than the air-to-air systems more common elsewhere. Asian countries made three-quarters of heat pumps globally in 2021.

== See also ==
- Category:Heating, ventilation, and air conditioning companies
- Transcritical cycle

== Sources ==
- Forster, P.; Storelvmo, T.; Armour, K.; Collins, W. (2021). "Chapter 7: The Earth's energy budget, climate feedbacks, and climate sensitivity Supplementary Material" (PDF). In Masson-Delmotte, V.; Zhai, P.; Pirani, A.; Connors, S. L.; et al. (eds.). Climate Change 2021: The Physical Science Basis (Report). Contribution of Working Group I to the Sixth Assessment Report of the Intergovernmental Panel on Climate Change. Cambridge University Press.
