= Coefficient of performance =

Ratio of useful heating or cooling provided to work required

The coefficient of performance or COP (sometimes CP or CoP) of a heat pump, refrigerator or air conditioning system is a ratio of the useful heating or cooling provided to the work (energy) required. Higher COPs equate to higher efficiency, lower energy (power) consumption and thus lower operating costs. While the coefficient of performance is a term commonly used with heat pumps, it is also applicable to any energy system that behaves in a thermodynamically open manner, receiving energy from the local environment, whether it be electromagnetic, electrostatic, or any other viable form.

Instead of converting work to heat (which has a maximum efficiency of 100% and a COP less than or equal to one), heat pumps, air conditioners and refrigeration systems use work to move existing heat from one place to another. Less work is required to move heat than to generate heat. Usually, more heat is moved than the amount of work put in so the COP usually exceeds 1, especially in heat pumps. The COP is highly dependent on operating conditions, especially absolute temperature and relative temperature between sink and system, and is often graphed or averaged against expected conditions. Most air conditioners have a COP of 3.5 to 5. Compared to compressor refrigerator chillers, the COP of absorption refrigerator chillers is typically much lower, as they do not rely on compression, but instead rely on chemical reactions driven by heat.

A difference between the dimensionless terms efficiency and COP is that the numerator in COP is the heat moved or generated, in contrast to the numerator in efficiency being only the heat generated. Additionally, efficiency cannot be used to evaluate the ability of a device to cool, because the useful output energy is undefined in this case.

As an example, if a heat pump has an internal compressor efficiency of 70% and the user supplies 1.2 kW of power to run the unit and 6.5 kW is drawn from the local thermal environment, then COP is 6.5/1.2 ≈ 5.417. The efficiency is already taken into account in the 6.5 kW; if the compressor efficiency is higher, it is expected to be higher than 6.5 kW (more heat moved) for the same input power.

== Equation ==
The equation is:
$$\mathrm{COP} = \frac{|Q|}{W}$$
where

- $Q$ is the useful heat supplied or removed by the considered system (machine).
- $W > 0$ is the net work put into the considered system in one cycle.

The COP for heating and cooling are different because the heat reservoir of interest is different. When one is interested in how well a machine cools, the COP is the ratio of the heat taken up from the cold reservoir to input work. However, for heating, the COP is the ratio of the magnitude of the heat given off to the hot reservoir (which is the heat taken up from the cold reservoir plus the input work) to the input work:
$$\mathrm{COP}_\text{cooling} = \frac{|Q_\text{C}|}{W} = \frac{Q_\text{C}}{W}$$
$$\mathrm{COP}_\text{heating} = \frac{|Q_\text{H}|}{W} = \frac{Q_\text{C} +  W}{W} = \mathrm{COP}_\text{cooling} + 1$$
where

- $Q_\text{C} > 0$ is the heat flow from the cold reservoir to the system; since heat is being extracted from the cold reservoir, this value is positive.
- $Q_\text{H} < 0$ is the heat flow from the hot reservoir to the system; since heat is being sunk into the hot reservoir, this value is negative. (see heat).

Note that the COP of a heat pump depends on its direction. The heat rejected to the hot sink is greater than the heat absorbed from the cold source, so the heating COP is greater by one than the cooling COP.

== Theoretical performance limits ==
According to the first law of thermodynamics, after a full cycle of the process $Q_\text{H} + Q_\text{C} + W = \Delta_\text{cycle}U = 0$ and thus $W = - Q_\text{H} - Q_\text{C}$.

Since $\left|Q_\text{H}\right| = -Q_\text{H}$, we obtain
$$\mathrm{COP}_\text{heating}=\frac{Q_\text{H}}{Q_\text{H}-Q_\text{C}}$$

For a heat pump operating at maximum theoretical efficiency (i.e. Carnot efficiency), it can be shown that

$\frac{Q_\text{H}}{T_\text{H}} + \frac{Q_\text{C}}{T_\text{C}}=0$ and thus $Q_\text{C}=-\frac{Q_\text{H}T_\text{C}}{T_\text{H}}$

where $T_\text{H}$ and $T_\text{C}$ are the thermodynamic temperatures of the hot and cold heat reservoirs, respectively.

At maximum theoretical efficiency, therefore
$$\mathrm{COP}_\text{heating}=\frac{T_\text{H}}{T_\text{H}-T_\text{C}} ,$$
which is equal to the reciprocal of the thermal efficiency of an ideal heat engine, because a heat pump is a heat engine operating in reverse.

Similarly, the COP of a refrigerator or air conditioner operating at maximum theoretical efficiency,
$$\mathrm{COP}_\text{cooling} = \frac{Q_\text{C}}{ Q_\text{H} - Q_\text{C}} = \frac{T_\text{C}}{T_\text{H} - T_\text{C}}$$

$\mathrm{COP}_\text{heating}$ applies to heat pumps and $\mathrm{COP}_\text{cooling}$ applies to air conditioners and refrigerators. Measured values for actual systems will always be significantly less than these theoretical maxima.

In Europe, the standard test conditions for ground source heat pump units use 308 K (35 °C; 95 °F) for ${T_\text{H}}$ and 273 K (0 °C; 32 °F) for ${T_\text{C}}$. According to the above formula, the maximum theoretical COPs would be
$$\begin{align}
\mathrm{COP}_\text{heating} &= \frac{308}{308-273} = 8.8 \\
\mathrm{COP}_\text{cooling} &= \frac{273}{308-273} = 7.8
\end{align}$$

Test results of the best systems are around 4.5. When measuring installed units over a whole season and accounting for the energy needed to pump water through the piping systems, seasonal COP's for heating are around 3.5 or less. This indicates room for further improvement.

The EU standard test conditions for an air source heat pump is at dry-bulb temperature of 20 °C (68 °F) for ${T_\text{H}}$ and 7 °C (44.6 °F) for ${T_\text{C}}$. Given sub-zero European winter temperatures, real world heating performance is significantly poorer than such standard COP figures suggest.

== Improving the COP ==
As the formula shows, the COP of a heat pump system can be improved by reducing the temperature gap $(\Delta T = T_\text{hot} - T_\text{cold})$ at which the system works. For a heating system this would mean two things:

1. Reducing the output temperature to around 30 °C (86 °F) which requires piped floor, wall or ceiling heating, or oversized water to air heaters.
2. Increasing the input temperature (e.g. by using an oversized ground source or by access to a solar-assisted thermal bank).

Accurately determining thermal conductivity will allow for much more precise ground loop or borehole sizing, resulting in higher return temperatures and a more efficient system. For an air cooler, the COP could be improved by using ground water as an input instead of air, and by reducing the temperature drop on the output side by increasing the air flow. For both systems, also increasing the size of pipes and air canals would help to reduce noise and the energy consumption of pumps (and ventilators) by decreasing the speed of the fluid, which in turn lowers the Reynolds number and hence the turbulence (and noise) and the head loss (see hydraulic head). The heat pump itself can be improved by increasing the size of the internal heat exchangers, which in turn increases the efficiency (and the cost) relative to the power of the compressor, and also by reducing the system's internal temperature gap over the compressor. Obviously, this latter measure makes some heat pumps unsuitable to produce high temperatures, which means that a separate machine is needed for producing, e.g., hot tap water.

The COP of absorption chillers can be improved by adding a second or third stage. Double and triple effect chillers are significantly more efficient than single effect chillers, and can surpass a COP of 1. They require higher pressure and higher temperature steam, but this is still a relatively small 10 pounds of steam per hour per ton of cooling.

== Seasonal efficiency ==
A realistic indication of energy efficiency over an entire year can be achieved by using seasonal COP or seasonal coefficient of performance (SCOP) for heat. Seasonal energy efficiency ratio (SEER) is mostly used for air conditioning. SCOP is a new methodology which gives a better indication of expected real-life performance of heat pump technology.

== See also ==
- Seasonal energy efficiency ratio (SEER)
- Seasonal thermal energy storage (STES)
- Heating seasonal performance factor (HSPF)
- Power usage effectiveness (PUE)
- Thermal efficiency
- Vapor-compression refrigeration
- Air conditioner
- HVAC
- Heat pump and refrigeration cycle
