= European seasonal energy efficiency ratio =

Eurovent standards for air conditioner performance depending on time of year

In Europe, the seasonal efficiency of refrigeration equipment, chillers and air conditioners is often rated by the European seasonal energy efficiency ratio (ESEER) which is controlled (among others) by the Eurovent Certification Company. A similar standard in the United States is the integrated energy efficiency ratio (IEER). Because ESEER is measured in units of watts for both electrical and cooling power, while the US standards use BTU/hour for cooling power and watt for electrical power, ESEER values are numerically significantly smaller.

The ESEER is calculated by combining full and part load operating Energy Efficiency Ratios (EER), for different seasonal air or water temperatures, and including for appropriate weighting factors. These values are shown in the following table.

ESEER Parameters
Partial load ratio	Air temperature (°C)	Water temperature (°C)	Weighting coefficients
100	35	30	3%
75	30	26	33%
50	25	22	41%
25	20	18	23%

The formula for ESEER can then be presented as follows:

ESEER = (EER@100% load × 0.03) + (EER@75% load × 0.33) + (EER@50% load × 0.41) + (EER@25% load × 0.23)

Eurovent publishes EER and ESEER values in its Directory of Certified Products together with cooling capacity and power input for standard conditions at full load for a wide variety of commercially available equipment.

== UK Building Regulations Part L SEER ==
In the United Kingdom, a Seasonal Energy Efficiency ratio (SEER) for refrigeration and air conditioning products, similar to the ESEER but with different load profile weighting factors, is used for part of the Building Regulations Part L calculations within the Simplified Building Energy Model (SBEM) software, and are used in the production of Energy Performance Certificates (EPC) for new buildings within the UK and the European Union; both as part of the European directive on the energy performance of buildings (EPBD).

The formula for SEER can be presented as follows:

SEER = a (EER@25% load) + b (EER@50% load) + c (EER@75% load) + d (EER@100% load)

where a,b,c,& d are the load profile weighting factors relevant to the proposed application.

== See also ==
- Seasonal energy efficiency ratio, the American definition and calculation of seasonal energy efficiency ratios
