= Heating seasonal performance factor =

Measure of the heating efficiency of air source heat pumps

Heating seasonal performance factor (HSPF) is a term used in the heating and cooling industry. HSPF is specifically used to measure the efficiency of air source heat pumps.

HSPF is defined as the ratio of heat output (measured in BTUs) over the heating season to electricity used (measured in watt-hours). It therefore has units of BTU/watt-hr. Being a ratio of two different units of energy, its energy efficiency interpretation involves a conversion of units (1 watt-hour is approximately 3.41 BTU).

The higher the HSPF rating of a unit, the more energy efficient it is. An electrical resistance heater, which is not considered efficient, has an HSPF of 3.41. Considering the unit conversion above, its energy efficiency or energy multiplier is 1. Dividing the HPSF rating by the 3.41 conversion factor (or multiplying by 0.293) makes it a dimensionless quantity that is interpreted as an energy multiplier.

Depending on the system, an HSPF ≥ 9 can be considered high efficiency and worthy of a US energy tax credit.

For instance, a system which delivers an HSPF of 9.7 will transfer 2.84 times as much heat as electricity consumed over a season. In Europe the term seasonal performance factor ("SPF") is used to mean the same as the average COP over the heating season, essentially a dimensionless near-equivalent of the HSPF. A system which transfers 2.84 times as much heat as the electricity consumed is said to have an SPF of 2.84. A well designed ground source heat pump installation should achieve an SPF of 3.5, or over 5 if linked to a solar-assisted thermal bank. This apparent "magic" happens because it moves additional energy from outside to make heat instead of only making heat directly as a resistance heater would.

Example: For a heat pump delivering 120,000,000 BTU during the season, when consuming 15,000 kWh, the HSPF can be calculated as :

HSPF = 120000000 (BTU) / (1000) / 15000 (kWh)
HSPF = 8

The HSPF is related to the dimensionless coefficient of performance (COP) for a heat pump, which measures the ratio of heat delivered to work done by the compressor. The HSPF can be converted to a seasonally-averaged COP assuming a lossless compressor and no heat loss by multiplying by the heat/energy equivalence factor 0.293 W·h per BTU. HSPF, which is normally measured rather than calculated, is reduced by losses due to such things as electrical resistance in the motor and thermal resistance in the evaporator.

== See also ==
- Coefficient of performance
- Heat pump
- SEER
