= Phase-out of fossil fuel boilers =

The phase-out of fossil fuel boilers is a set of policies to remove the use of fossil gas (or "natural gas") and other fossil fuels from the heating of buildings and use in appliances. Typically gas is used to heat water, for showering, or central heating. In many countries, gas heating is one of the major contributors to greenhouse gas emissions and climate damage, leading a growing number of countries to introduce bans. Air source heat pumps are the main alternative.

The International Energy Agency has said that new gas boilers (or gas furnaces) should be banned no later than 2025. Many installations and appliances have a life-span of 25 years, leading for calls that the bans must take place immediately, or at latest by 2025, because otherwise targets of net zero by 2050 cannot or are unlikely to be reached. However fossil fuels lobbyists are resisting phase-out.

== List of gas boiler bans ==
The following table lists different ban types in new or existing buildings.

State	Measure	Date	Details
Austria	Ban on gas, oil and coal boiler installation and heaters in new buildings.	2023	Further plan to ban oil and coal boilers in existing buildings.
Belgium	Ban on new oil boilers and gas connections in Flanders in all new buildings.	2025	Only in Flanders
California	Ban on new gas furnaces and water heaters.	2030	California Air Resources Board writing rules to implement.
Denmark	Convert all 400,000 gas boilers to district heating and heat pumps	2029	Use obligation and duty for renewable energy
France	Oil and gas boilers banned in new buildings	2023	
Germany	Ban on coal and oil boilers in existing buildings	2026	Aim to have 65% renewable energy in existing buildings from 2024
Ireland	Gas and oil boilers banned from installation.	2025	
Italy	60% renewables in new homes	2022	
Luxembourg	No new gas and oil installations in new buildings	2023	
Netherlands	Ban on connections to the grid for new buildings from 2018.	2026	Mandatory heat pumps from 2026
Norway	Ban on gas and oil in existing or new homes		
Slovakia	Ban on sales and installation of new oil and gas boilers	2023	
UK	Ban on gas and oil boilers in new buildings	2035	

== See also ==
- Fossil fuel phase-out
- Phase-out of fossil fuel vehicles
- Plastic bans
- Montreal Protocol
