= Gustav Lorentzen (scientist) =

Norwegian scientist

Gustav Fredrik Lorentzen (13 January 1915 – 7 August 1995) was a Norwegian thermodynamic scientist.

Gustav Lorentzen was a professor at Norwegian Institute of Technology, and Norwegian University of Science and Technology. In the late 1980s, Gustav Lorentzen rediscovered how CO_{2} could be used as a refrigerant in heating and cooling applications. He developed the modern thermodynamic transcritical cycle in 1988–1991. In 1988 Lorentzen designed a concept for a new, but simple and efficient way of regulating CO_{2} systems. This idea became the turning point in the re-invention of CO_{2} cooling technology. Meanwhile, the Japanese corporation Denso had familiarized itself with Lorentzen's dissertation in 1993, and was evaluating the concept as a basis for a new air-condition application in cars. A series of communications between Lorentzen and Denso followed and the result of the collaboration between Lorentzen and Denso was a fundamental step in the innovation of EcoCute which was commercialized in 2000s.

== See also ==
- Transcritical cycle
- SINTEF
