= Air conditioning =

Cooling of air in an enclosed space

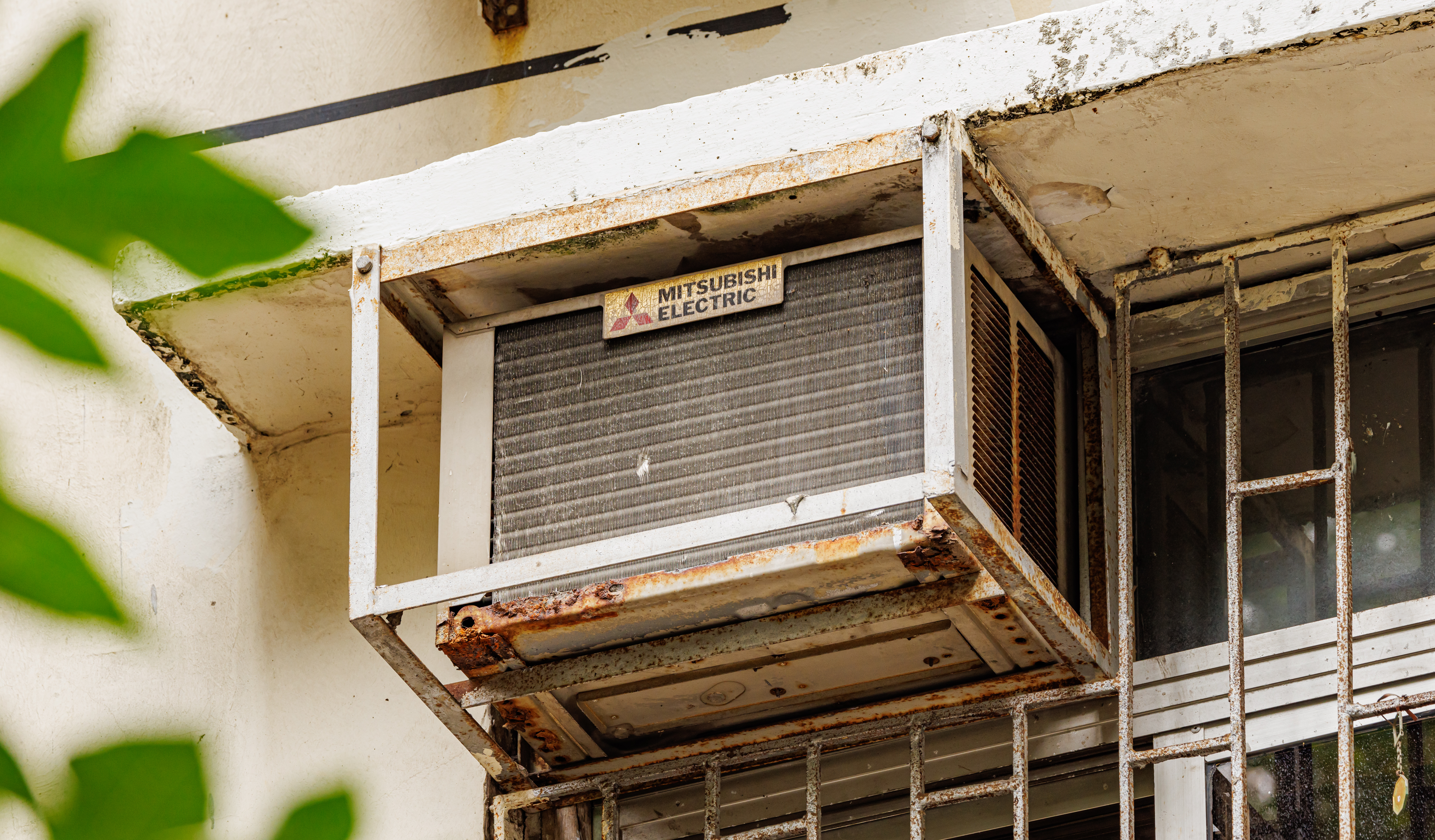
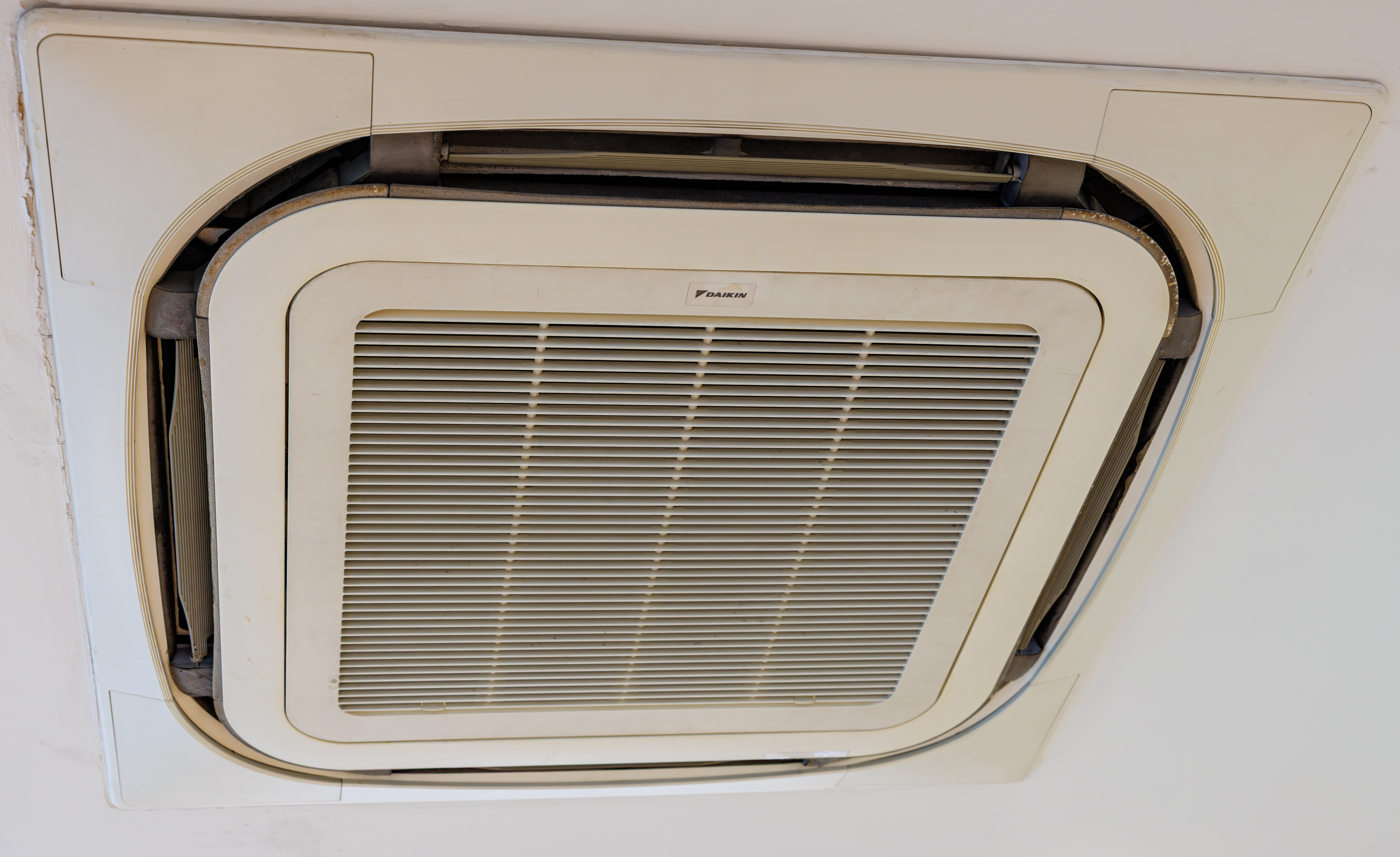
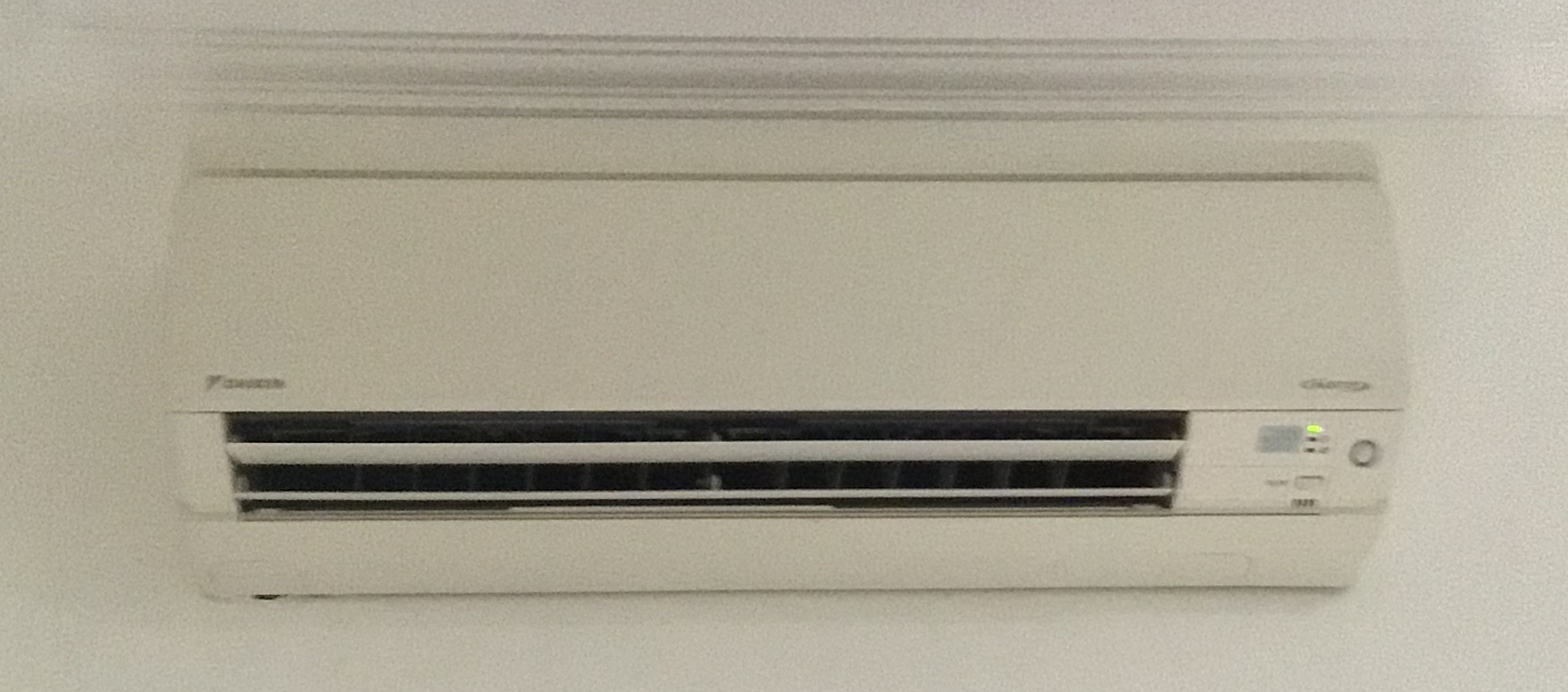
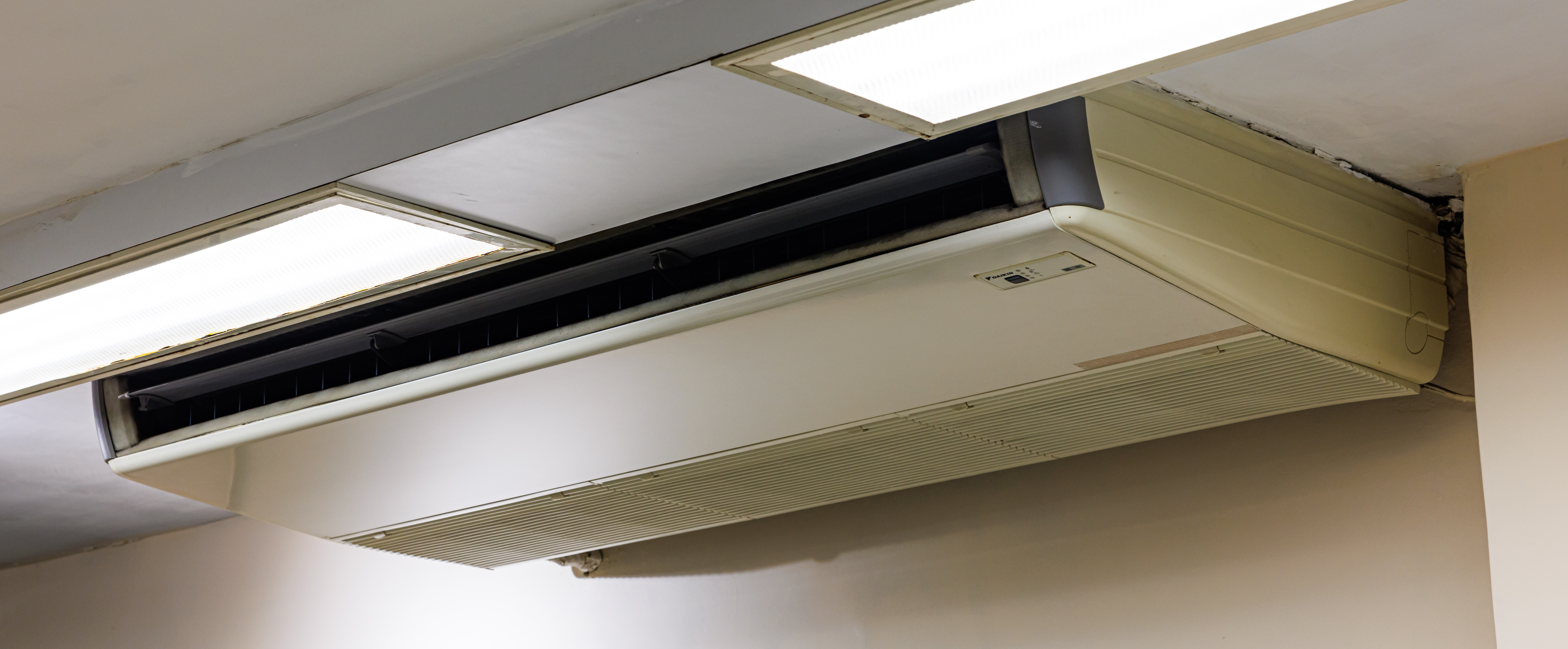
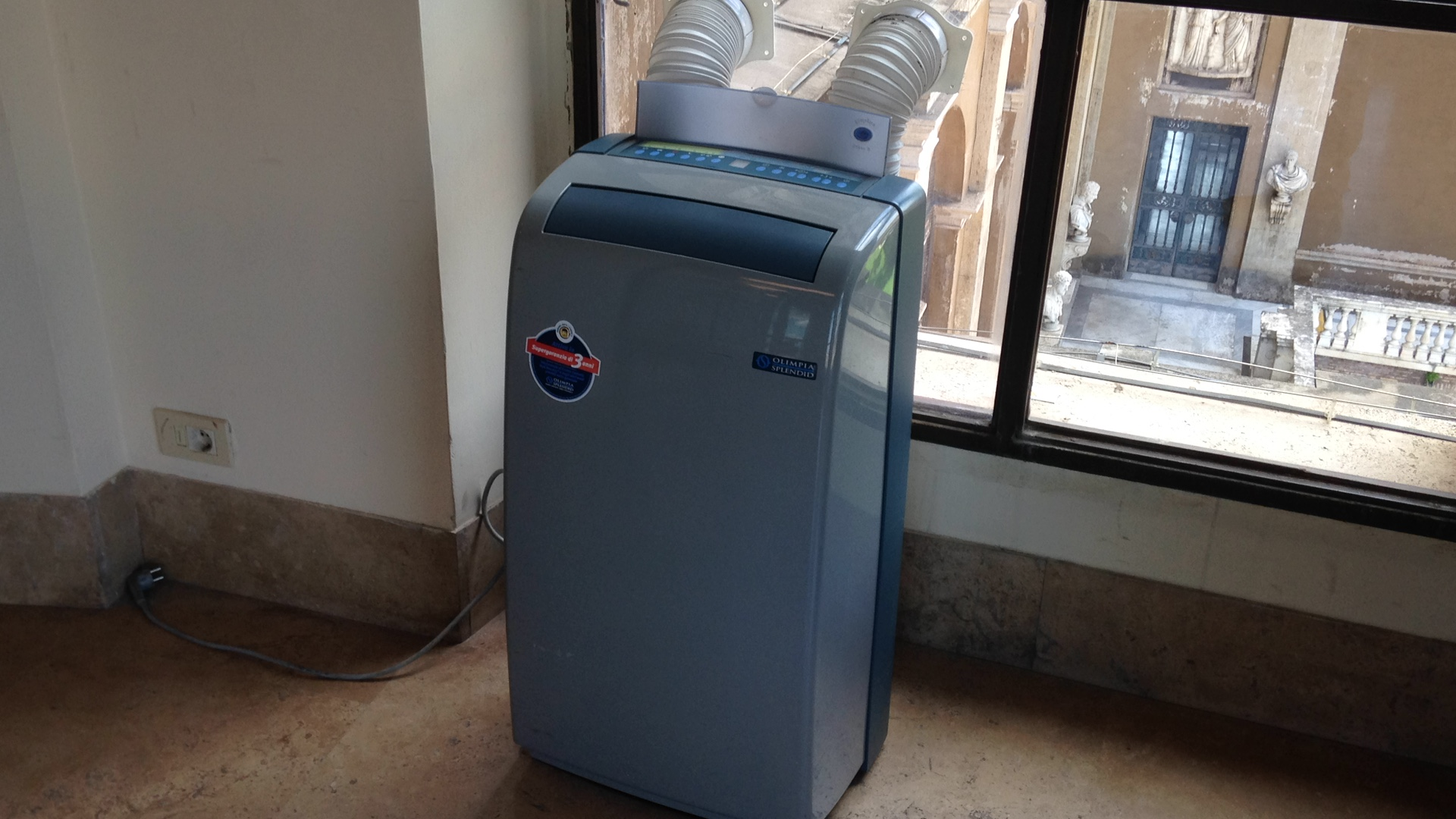
There are various types of air conditioners. Popular examples include: Window-mounted air conditioner (China, 2023); Ceiling-mounted cassette air conditioner (China, 2023); Wall-mounted air conditioner (Japan, 2020); Ceiling-mounted console (Also called ceiling suspended) air conditioner (China, 2023); and portable air conditioner (Vatican City, 2018).

Air conditioning, often abbreviated as A/C (US) or air con (UK), is the process of removing heat from an enclosed space to achieve a more comfortable interior temperature and, in some cases, controlling the humidity of internal air. Air conditioning can be achieved using a mechanical air conditioner or through other methods, such as passive cooling and ventilative cooling. Air conditioning is a member of a family of systems and techniques that provide heating, ventilation, and air conditioning (HVAC). Heat pumps are similar in many ways to air conditioners but use a reversing valve, allowing them to both heat and cool an enclosed space.

In hot weather, air conditioning can prevent heat stroke, dehydration due to excessive sweating, electrolyte imbalance, kidney failure, and other issues due to hyperthermia. An estimated 190,000 heat-related deaths are averted annually owing to air conditioning. Air conditioners increase productivity in hot climates, and historians rank air conditioning as a key factor that shaped postwar metropolitan growth, alongside highways, automobiles, shopping malls, and suburban housing. As of 2022, air conditioning used about 7% of global electricity and emitted 3% of greenhouse gas.

Air conditioners, which typically use vapor-compression refrigeration, range in size from small units used in vehicles or single rooms to massive units that can cool large buildings. Air source heat pumps, which can be used for heating as well as cooling, are becoming increasingly common in cooler climates. According to the International Energy Agency (IEA) 1.6 billion air conditioning units were used globally in 2016. The United Nations has called for the technology to be made more sustainable to mitigate climate change and for the use of alternatives, such as passive cooling, evaporative cooling, selective shading, windcatchers, and thermal insulation.

== History ==
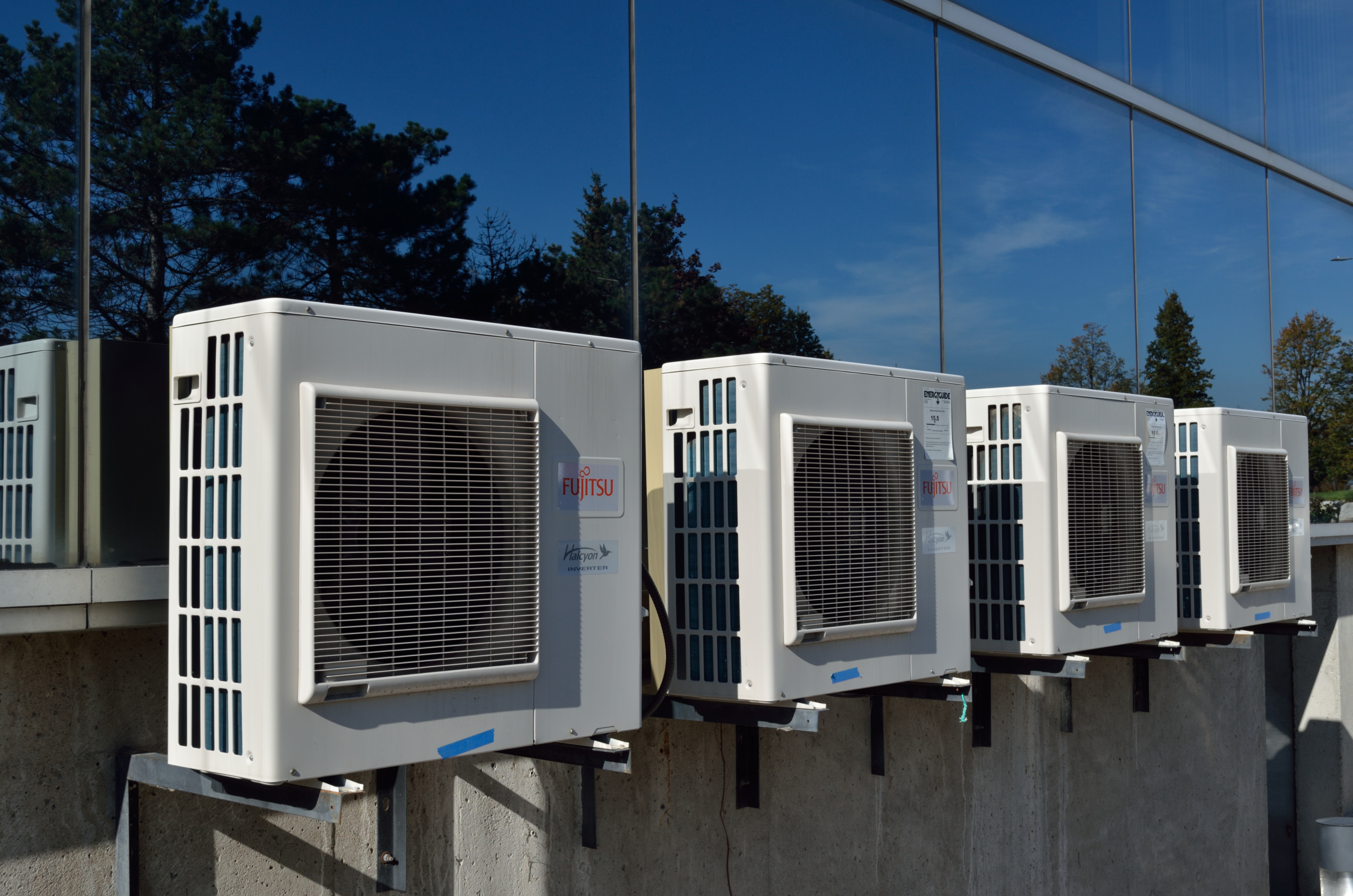
An array of air conditioner condenser units outside a commercial office building

Air conditioning dates back to prehistory. Double-walled living quarters, with a gap between the two walls to encourage air flow, were found in the ancient city of Hamoukar, in modern Syria. Ancient Egyptian buildings also used a wide variety of passive air-conditioning techniques. These became widespread from the Iberian Peninsula through North Africa, the Middle East, and Northern India.

Passive techniques remained widespread until the 20th century when they fell out of fashion and were replaced by powered air conditioning. Using information from engineering studies of traditional buildings, passive techniques are being revived and modified for 21st-century architectural designs.

Air conditioners allow the building's indoor environment to remain relatively constant, largely independent of changes in external weather conditions and internal heat loads. They also enable deep plan buildings to be created and have allowed people to live comfortably in hotter parts of the world.

=== Development ===
==== Preceding discoveries ====
In 1558, Giambattista della Porta described a method of chilling ice to temperatures far below its freezing point by mixing it with potassium nitrate (then called "nitre") in his popular science book Natural Magic. In 1620, Cornelis Drebbel demonstrated "Turning Summer into Winter" for James I of England, chilling part of the Great Hall of Westminster Abbey with an apparatus of troughs and vats. Drebbel's contemporary Francis Bacon, like della Porta a believer in science communication, may not have been present at the demonstration, but in a book published later the same year, he described it as "experiment of artificial freezing" and said that "Nitre (or rather its spirit) is very cold, and hence nitre or salt when added to snow or ice intensifies the cold of the latter, the nitre by adding to its cold, but the salt by supplying activity to the cold of the snow."

In 1758, Benjamin Franklin and John Hadley, a chemistry professor at the University of Cambridge, conducted experiments applying the principle of evaporation as a means to cool an object rapidly. Franklin and Hadley confirmed that the evaporation of highly volatile liquids (such as alcohol and ether) could be used to drive down the temperature of an object past the freezing point of water. They experimented with the bulb of a mercury-in-glass thermometer as their object. They used a bellows to speed up the evaporation. They lowered the temperature of the thermometer bulb down to −14 °C (7 °F) while the ambient temperature was 18 °C (64 °F). Franklin noted that soon after they passed the freezing point of water 0 °C (32 °F), a thin film of ice formed on the surface of the thermometer's bulb and that the ice mass was about 6 mm (1/4 in) thick when they stopped the experiment upon reaching −14 °C (7 °F). Franklin concluded: "From this experiment, one may see the possibility of freezing a man to death on a warm summer's day."

The 19th century included many developments in compression technology. In 1820, English scientist and inventor Michael Faraday discovered that compressing and liquefying ammonia could chill air when the liquefied ammonia was allowed to evaporate. In 1842, Florida physician John Gorrie used compressor technology to create ice, which he used to cool air for his patients in his hospital in Apalachicola, Florida. He hoped to eventually use his ice-making machine to regulate the temperature of buildings. He envisioned centralized air conditioning that could cool entire cities. Gorrie was granted a patent in 1851, but following the death of his main backer, he was not able to realize his invention. In 1851, James Harrison created the first mechanical ice-making machine in Geelong, Australia, and was granted a patent for an ether vapor-compression refrigeration system in 1855 that produced three tons of ice per day. In 1860, Harrison established a second ice company. He later entered the debate over competing against the American advantage of ice-refrigerated beef sales to the United Kingdom.

==== First devices ====
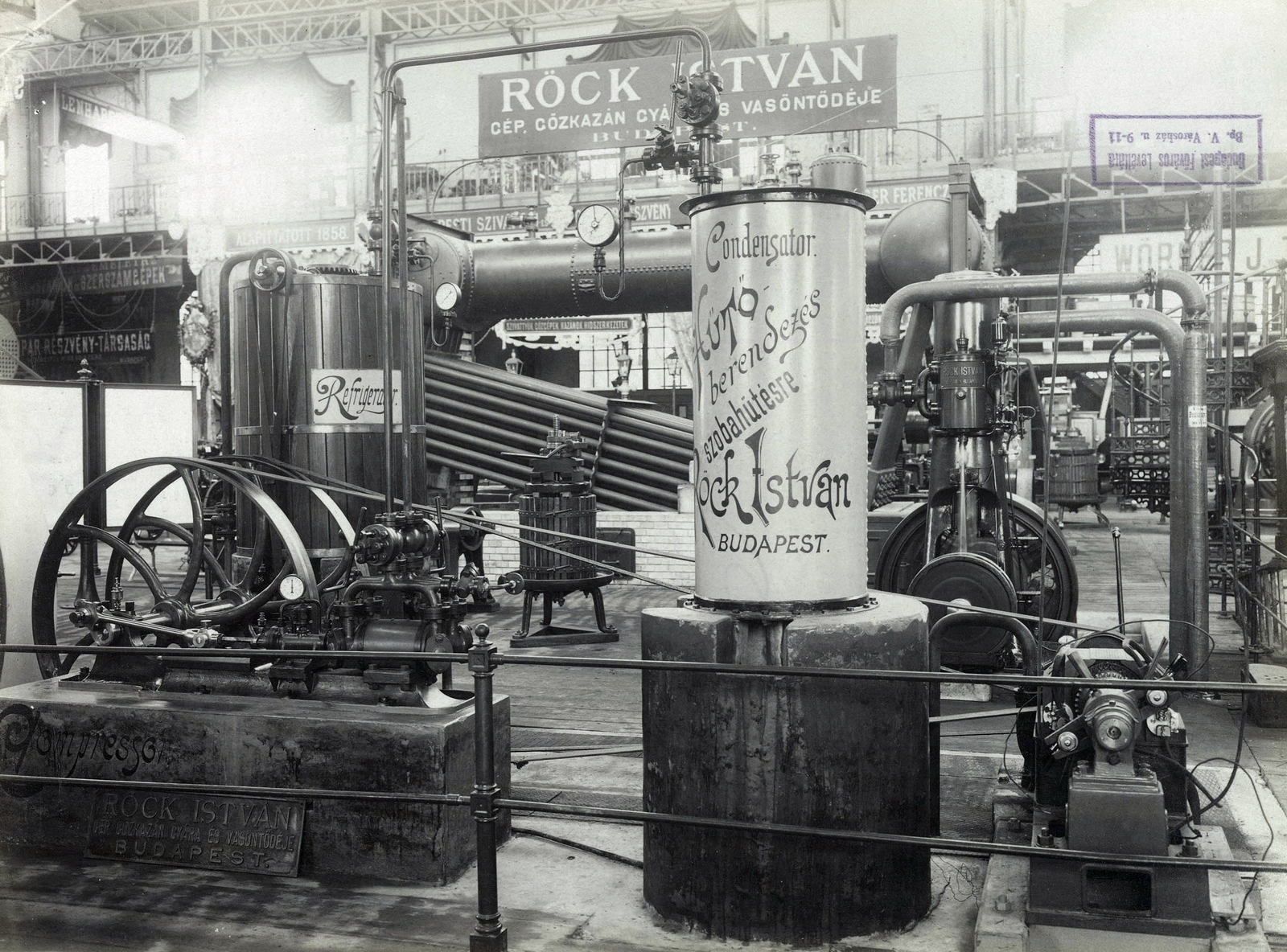
The István Röck factory exhibits a small home refrigerator, an air cooling device for large rooms, and a large industrial refrigerator (in the background) at the 1896 National Millennium Exhibition in Budapest

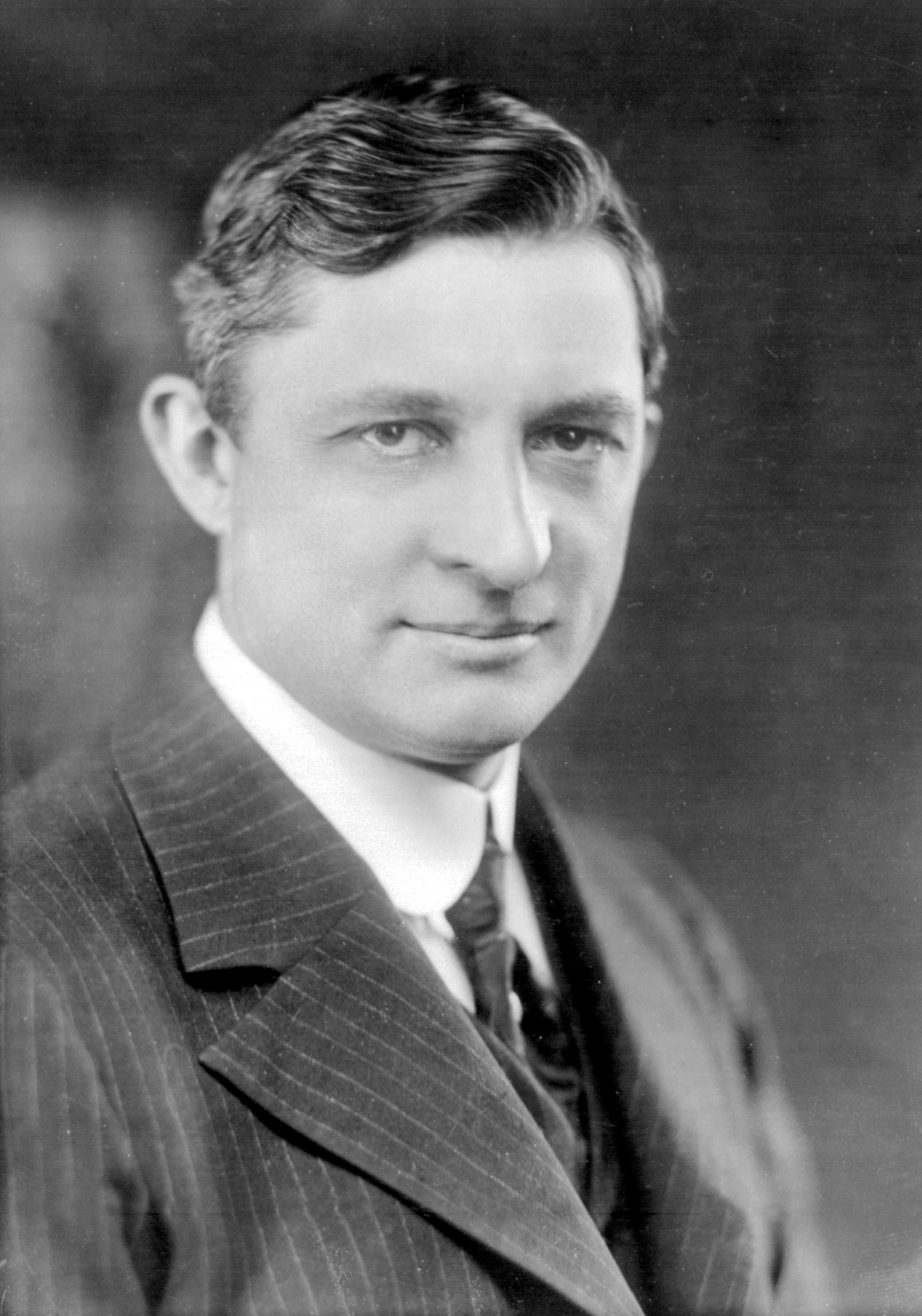
Willis Carrier, who developed the first modern electrical air-conditioning system; an important early industrial installation of his technology took place at Chronicle Cotton Mills in Belmont, North Carolina, in 1906

While early cooling systems typically relied on bulky reciprocating steam engines for power, a significant technological shift occurred in 1894 when Hungarian engineer István Röck began manufacturing industrial ammonia compressors driven by electric motors (developed in collaboration with the Ganz Works). This innovation made the systems more compact and suitable for urban environments. By 1896, his factory produced 'dry air cooling apparatuses' specifically designed for the cooling and dehumidification of hospitals, theaters, large public halls, and even residential rooms, several years before the widespread commercialization of modern air conditioning. This system operated by using an electric motor-driven ammonia compressor to chill a secondary refrigerant, typically brine (salt water). This cold brine was circulated through pipes to a 'dry air cooling unit' (a precursor to the modern air handler), where a fan forced ambient air over the chilled coils. This process not only lowered the temperature but also dehumidified the air by condensing moisture on the cold surfaces.

Electricity made more practical mechanically powered systems possible. In 1902, American engineer Willis Carrier designed what is widely regarded as the first modern electrical air-conditioning system for the Sackett-Wilhelms Lithographing & Publishing Company in Brooklyn, New York. The installation controlled both temperature and humidity, helping stabilize paper dimensions and the alignment of inks during color printing. On January 2, 1906, Carrier received U.S. patent 808,897 for an Apparatus for Treating Air, a spray-type system designed to humidify or dehumidify air.

==== Early industrial systems ====
The textile industry became an important early setting for the development of mechanical air conditioning because temperature and humidity affected fibers and manufacturing processes. In 1906, Carrier sold his spray-type apparatus to Chronicle Cotton Mills in Belmont, North Carolina, in Gaston County, North Carolina. The equipment was connected to the mill's existing fan-heating system and became the first central-station humidifying system installed for an industrial facility.

The Chronicle installation did not initially operate successfully, but the problems encountered in Belmont influenced Carrier's subsequent designs. In 1907, using lessons from the Chronicle project, Carrier installed a counter-flow device at Lowell Cotton Mill elsewhere in Gaston County to introduce greater moisture into the air. The Encyclopedia of North Carolina identifies the 1906 Chronicle Mills installation as the first air-conditioning system in the Southern United States, while North Carolina State University's textile-history project describes it as one of the first industrial air-cooling or humidification systems in the United States.

Gaston County became an important early center of industrial-process air-conditioning experimentation. In addition to Carrier's work in Belmont and at Lowell Cotton Mill, Stuart W. Cramer developed humidification and air-conditioning systems for textile mills in the county, including at Mays Mills in what became Cramerton, North Carolina, and at Loray Mill in Gastonia, North Carolina. The National Register documentation for Loray Mill describes these projects collectively as nationally significant experiments in the development of industrial process air conditioning.

Cramer, an engineer and textile-mill owner based in Charlotte, North Carolina, coined the term "air conditioning" in 1906. In a paper presented to the American Cotton Manufacturers Association that year, he used the term to encompass humidifying, air cleaning, heating and ventilation. Carrier subsequently incorporated the term into the name of the Carrier Air Conditioning Company of America, established by Buffalo Forge in 1907 to manufacture Carrier equipment and engineer systems for customers.

In 1914, the first domestic air conditioning was installed in Minneapolis in the home of Charles Gilbert Gates. It is, however, possible that the considerable device (c. 2.1 m × 1.8 m × 6.1 m; 7 ft × 6 ft × 20 ft) was never used, as the house remained uninhabited (Gates had already died in October 1913.)

In 1915, Carrier and six colleagues founded the Carrier Engineering Corporation to manufacture and sell heating, ventilation and air-conditioning systems. The company later became Carrier Corporation.

In 1931, H.H. Schultz and J.Q. Sherman developed what would become the most common type of individual room air conditioner: one designed to sit on a window ledge. The units went on sale in 1932 at US$10,000 to $50,000 (the equivalent of $200,000 to $1,200,000 in 2025.) A year later, the first air conditioning systems for cars were offered for sale. Chrysler Motors introduced the first practical semi-portable air conditioning unit in 1935, and Packard became the first automobile manufacturer to offer an air conditioning unit in its cars in 1939.

==== Further development ====
Innovations in the latter half of the 20th century allowed more ubiquitous air conditioner use. In 1945, Robert Sherman of Lynn, Massachusetts, invented a portable, in-window air conditioner that cooled, heated, humidified, dehumidified, and filtered the air. Henry Galson developed a more compact and inexpensive version of the in-window air conditioner, selling more than 43,000 units by 1947. It allowed air conditioning to be accessible by the general public. The first inverter air conditioners were released in 1980–1981.

In 1954, Ned Cole, a 1939 architecture graduate from the University of Texas at Austin, developed the first experimental "suburb" with inbuilt air conditioning in each house. 22 homes were developed on a flat, treeless track in northwest Austin, Texas, and the community was christened the 'Austin Air-Conditioned Village.' The residents were subjected to a year-long study of the effects of air conditioning led by the nation's premier air conditioning companies, builders, and social scientists. In addition, researchers from UT's Health Service and Psychology Department studied the effects on the "artificially cooled humans". One of the more amusing discoveries was that each family reported being troubled with scorpions, the leading theory being that scorpions sought cool, shady places. Other reported changes in lifestyle were that mothers baked more, families ate heavier foods, and they were more apt to choose hot drinks.

Air conditioner adoption tends to increase above around $10,000 (circa 2021) annual household income in warmer areas. Global GDP growth explains around 85% of increased air condition adoption by 2050, while the remaining 15% can be explained by climate change.

===== Air conditioning linked to heat island effect =====
The urban heat island effect was first scientifically noted by Luke Howard in the 1810s, who described London being several degrees warmer than its rural surroundings at night. The phenomenon gained attention in the late 1960s, mainly in Japan and North America.

From the late 1980s to early 2010s, studies began to link air conditioners to the urban heat island effect. The phenomenon was observed in various cities such as Tokyo and Houston.

== Use by region ==
Projected number of air conditionning units from 2017 onward.

As of 2016, an estimated 1.6 billion air conditioning units were used worldwide, with over half of them in China and the United States, and with a total cooling capacity of 11,675 gigawatts. The International Energy Agency predicted in 2018 that the number of air conditioning units would grow to around 4 billion units by 2050 and that the total cooling capacity would grow to around 23,000 GW, with the biggest increases in India and China.

=== Asia ===
Between 1995 and 2004, the proportion of urban households in China with air conditioners increased from 8% to 70%. Between 2010 and 2023, air conditioner use in India tripled to 24 units per 100 households, with the most ownership in Haryana, Chandigarh, Rajasthan, and Delhi and the least in Meghalaya, Tripura, Manipur, and Himachal Pradesh.

=== North America ===
As of 2015, nearly 100 million homes in the United States, or about 87% of US households, had air conditioning systems. In 2019, it was estimated that 90% of new single-family homes constructed in the US included air conditioning, ranging from 99% in the South to 62% in the West.

=== Europe ===
As of 2025, roughly half of homes in Italy, 40 percent of homes in Spain, and 20 to 25 percent of homes in France had air conditioning.

== Operation ==
=== Operating principles ===
A simple stylized diagram of the refrigeration cycle: 1) condensing coil, 2) expansion valve, 3) evaporator coil, 4) compressor

Cooling in traditional air conditioner systems is accomplished using the vapor-compression cycle, which uses a refrigerant's forced circulation and phase change between gas and liquid to transfer heat. The vapor-compression cycle can occur within a unitary, or packaged piece of equipment, or within a chiller that is connected to terminal cooling equipment (such as a fan coil unit in an air handler) on its evaporator side and heat rejection equipment such as a cooling tower on its condenser side. An air source heat pump shares many components with an air conditioning system, but includes a reversing valve, which allows the unit to be used to heat as well as cool a space.

Air conditioning equipment will reduce the absolute humidity of the air processed by the system if the surface of the evaporator coil is significantly cooler than the dew point of the surrounding air. An air conditioner designed for an occupied space will typically achieve a 30% to 60% relative humidity in the occupied space.

Some air-conditioning systems can use reduced indoor airflow during cooling to increase the proportion of latent moisture removal. The effect depends on the equipment and operating conditions; reduced airflow can also lower sensible and total cooling capacity, and excessively low airflow can cause evaporator-coil icing.

A conventional refrigerant dehumidifier cools incoming air below its dew point at the evaporator, where moisture condenses, and then passes the dried air over the condenser to reheat it before returning it to the space.

Free cooling can sometimes be selected when the external air is cooler than the internal air. In this case, the compressor does not need to be used, resulting in high cooling efficiencies for these times. This may also be combined with seasonal thermal energy storage.

==== Heating ====
Some air conditioning systems can reverse the refrigeration cycle and act as an air source heat pump, thus heating instead of cooling the indoor environment. They are also commonly referred to as "reverse cycle air conditioners". The heat pump is significantly more energy-efficient than electric resistance heating, because it moves energy from air or groundwater to the heated space and the heat from purchased electrical energy. When the heat pump is in heating mode, the indoor evaporator coil switches roles and becomes the condenser coil, producing heat and the outdoor condenser unit also switches roles to serve as the evaporator and discharges cold air (colder than the ambient outdoor air).

Most air source heat pumps become less efficient in outdoor temperatures lower than 4 °C or 40 °F. This is partly because ice forms on the outdoor unit's heat exchanger coil, which blocks air flow over the coil. To compensate for this, the heat pump system must temporarily switch back into the regular air conditioning mode to switch the outdoor evaporator coil back to being the condenser coil, so it can heat up and defrost. Therefore, some heat pump systems will have electric resistance heating in the indoor air path that is activated only in this mode to compensate for the temporary indoor air cooling, which would otherwise be uncomfortable in the winter.

Newer models have improved cold-weather performance, with efficient heating capacity down to −14 °F (−26 °C). However, there is always a chance that the humidity that condenses on the heat exchanger of the outdoor unit could freeze, even in models that have improved cold-weather performance, requiring a defrosting cycle to be performed.

Heat pumping capacity declines as temperature difference increases, while at the same time heating needs increase, so heat pumps are sometimes installed in tandem with a more conventional form of heating, such as an electrical heater, a natural gas, heating oil, or wood-burning fireplace or central heating, which is used instead of or in addition to the heat pump during harsher winter temperatures. In this case, the heat pump is used efficiently during milder temperatures, and the system is switched to the conventional heat source when the outdoor temperature is lower.

=== Performance ===
The coefficient of performance (COP) of an air conditioning system is a ratio of useful heating or cooling provided to the work required. Higher COPs equate to lower operating costs. The COP usually exceeds 1; however, the exact value is highly dependent on operating conditions, especially absolute temperature and relative temperature between sink and system, and is often graphed or averaged against expected conditions. Air conditioner equipment power in the U.S. is often described in terms of "tons of refrigeration", with each approximately equal to the cooling power of one short ton (2,000 pounds (910 kg) of ice melting in a 24-hour period. The value is equal to 12,000 BTU_{IT} per hour, or 3,517 watts. Residential central air systems are usually from 1 to 5 tons (3.5 to 18 kW) in capacity.

The efficiency of air conditioners is often rated by the seasonal energy efficiency ratio (SEER), which is defined by the Air Conditioning, Heating and Refrigeration Institute in its 2008 standard AHRI 210/240, Performance Rating of Unitary Air-Conditioning and Air-Source Heat Pump Equipment. A similar standard is the European seasonal energy efficiency ratio (ESEER).

Efficiency is strongly affected by the humidity of the air to be cooled. Dehumidifying the air before attempting to cool it can reduce subsequent cooling costs by as much as 90 percent. Thus, reducing dehumidifying costs can materially affect overall air conditioning costs.

== Control system ==
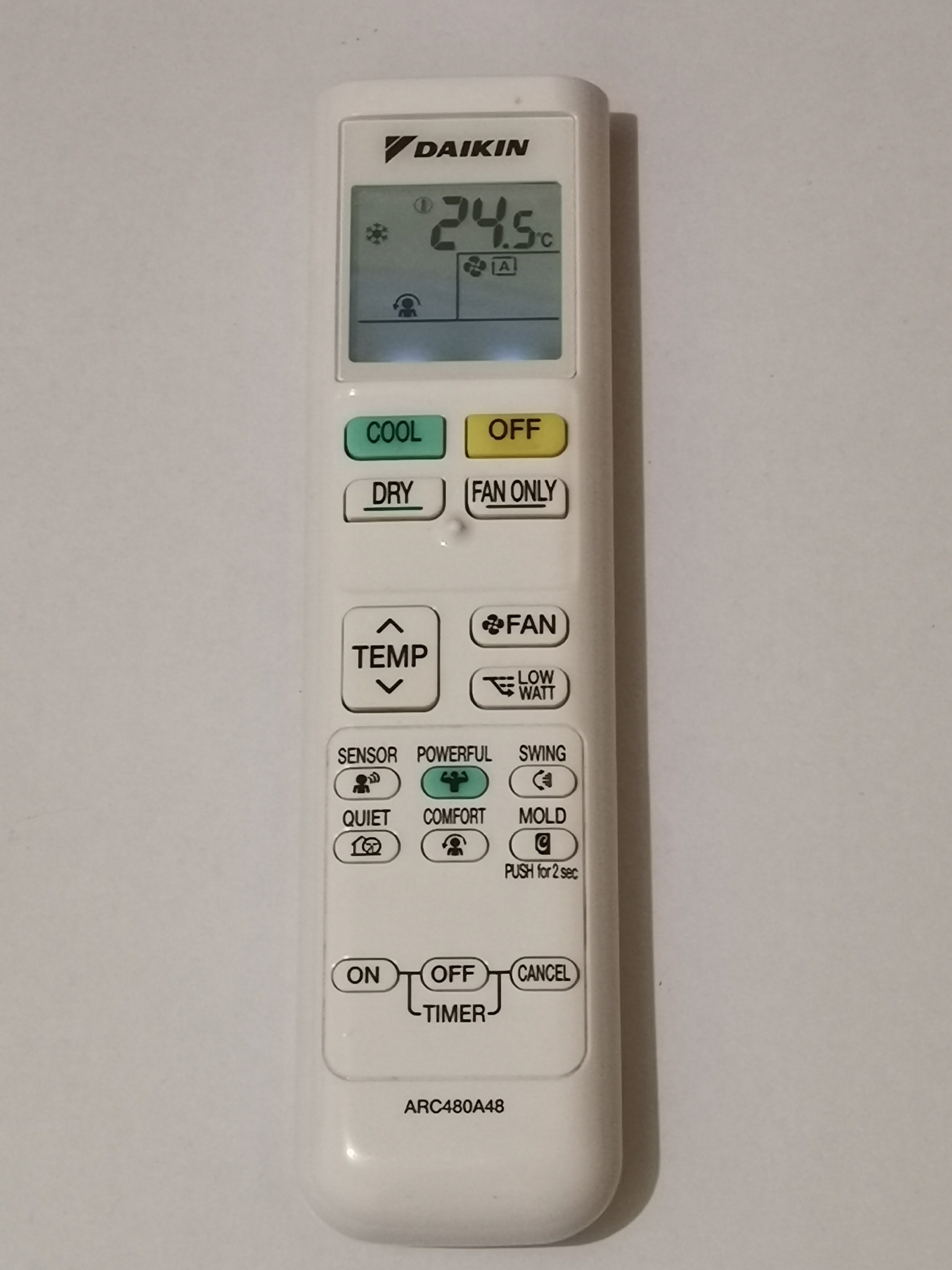
A wireless remote controller

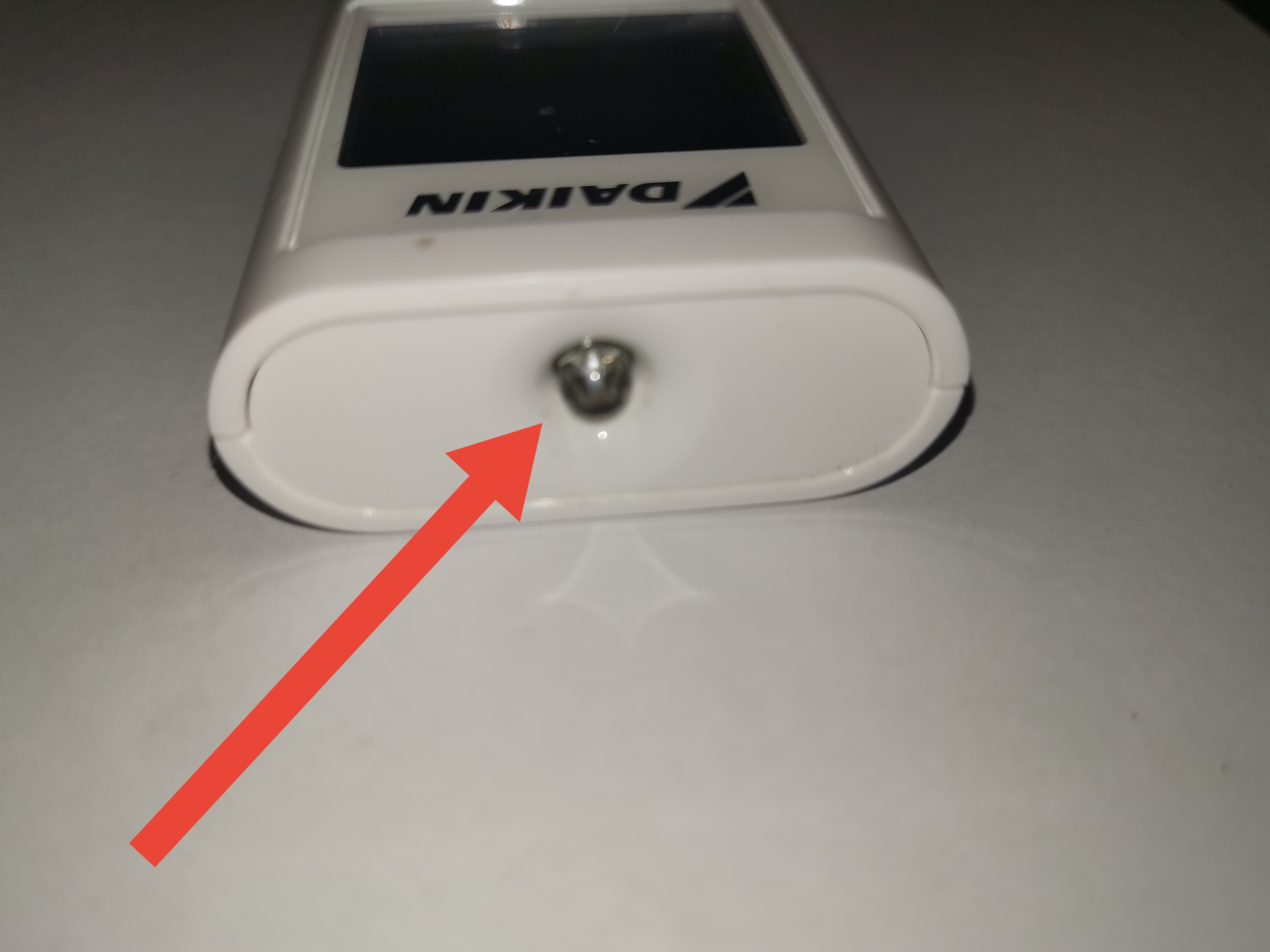
The infrared transmitting LED on the remote

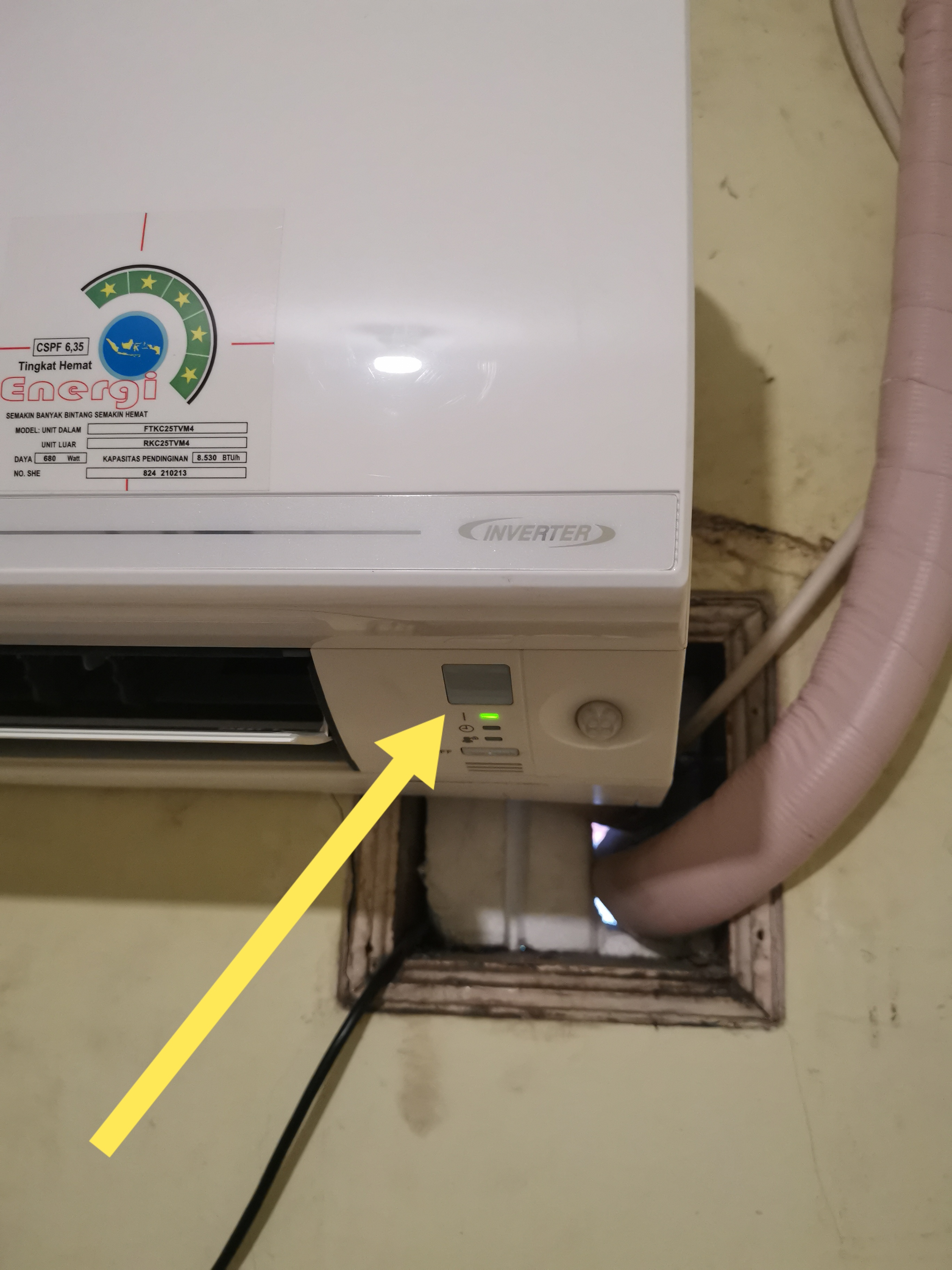
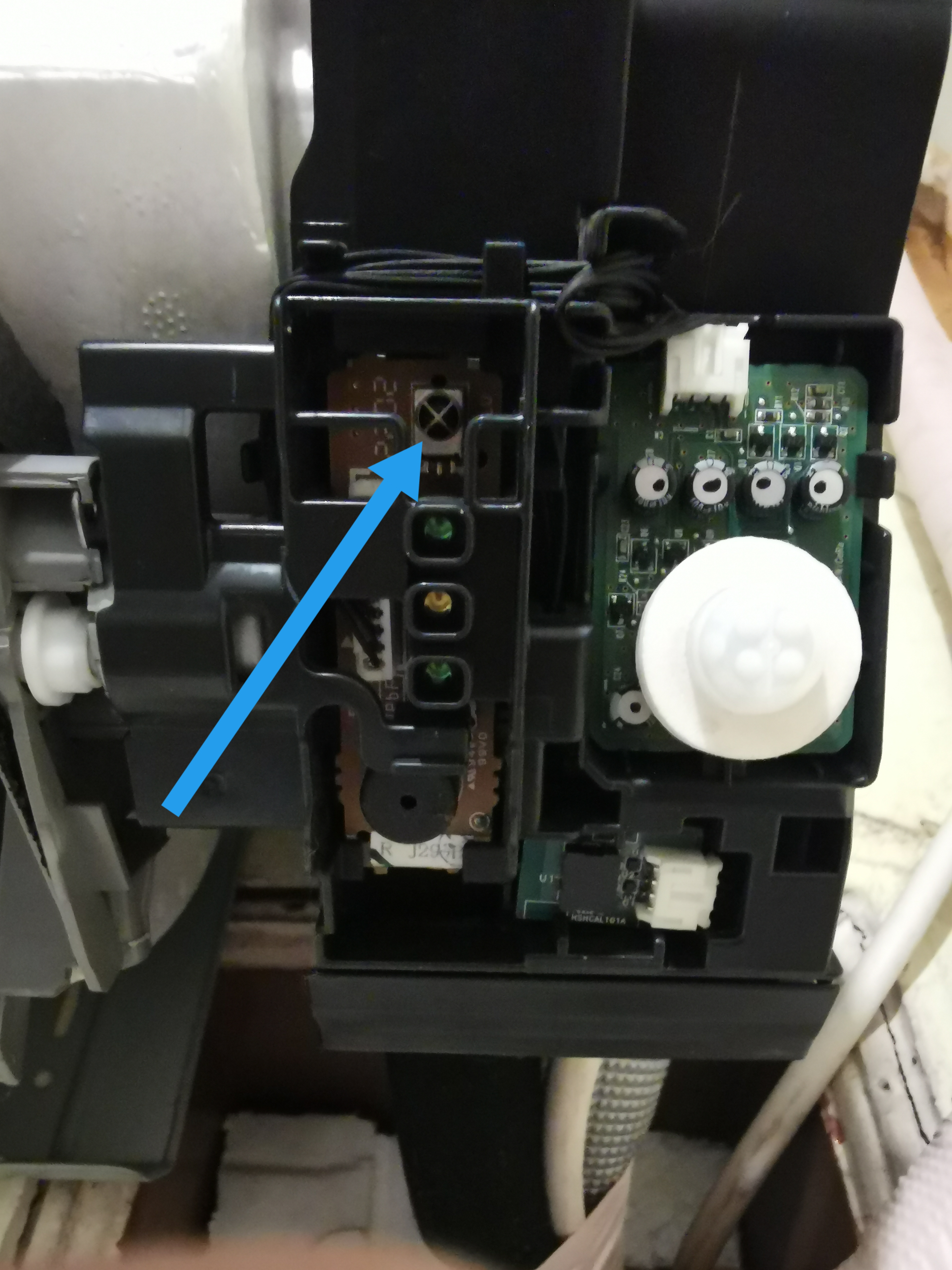
The infrared receiver on the air conditioner

=== Wireless remote control ===
This type of controller uses an infrared LED to relay commands from a remote control to the air conditioner. The output of the infrared LED (like that of any infrared remote) is invisible to the human eye because its wavelength is beyond the range of visible light (940 nm). This system is commonly used on mini-split air conditioners because it is simple and portable. Some window and ducted central air conditioners use it as well.

=== Wired controller ===
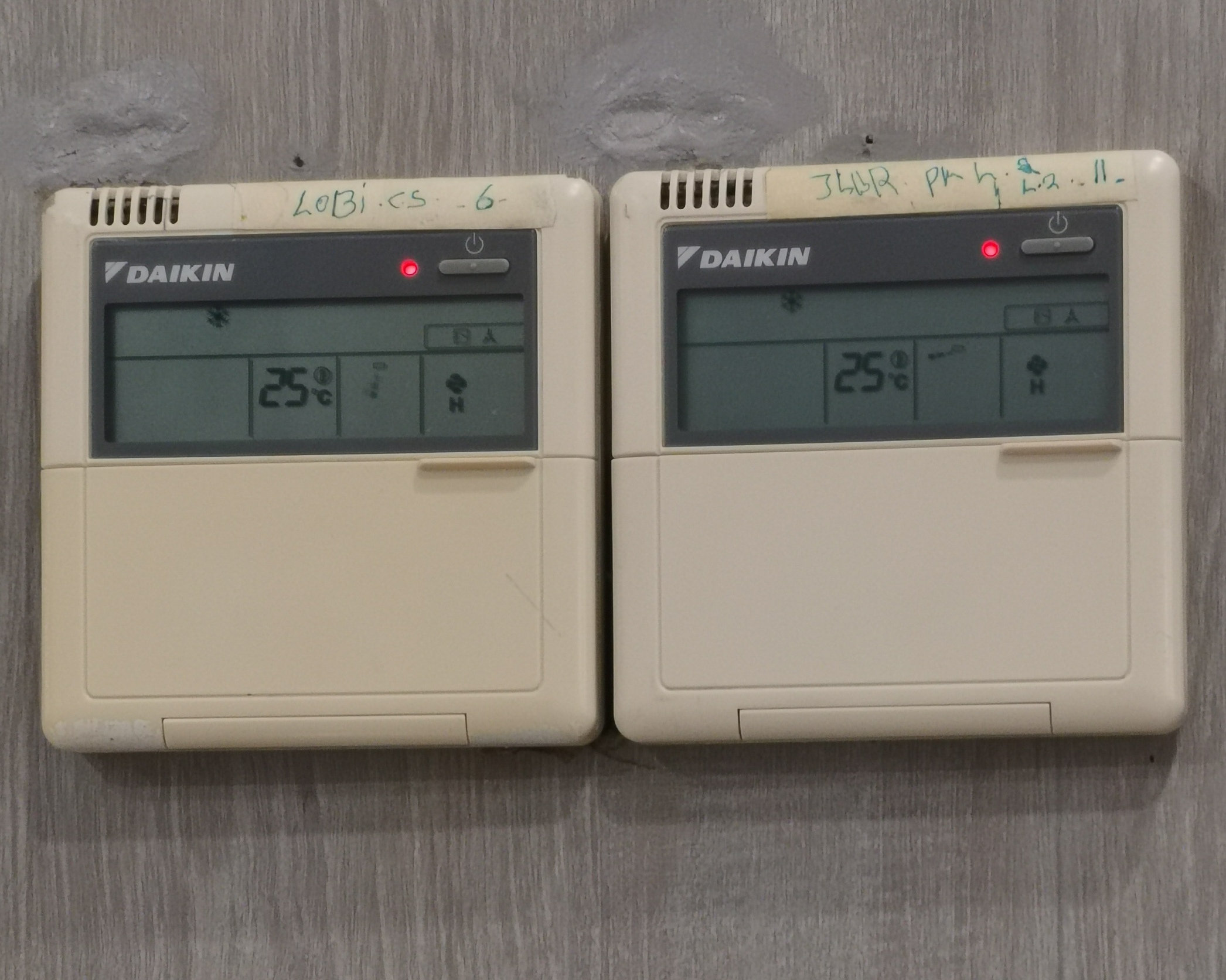
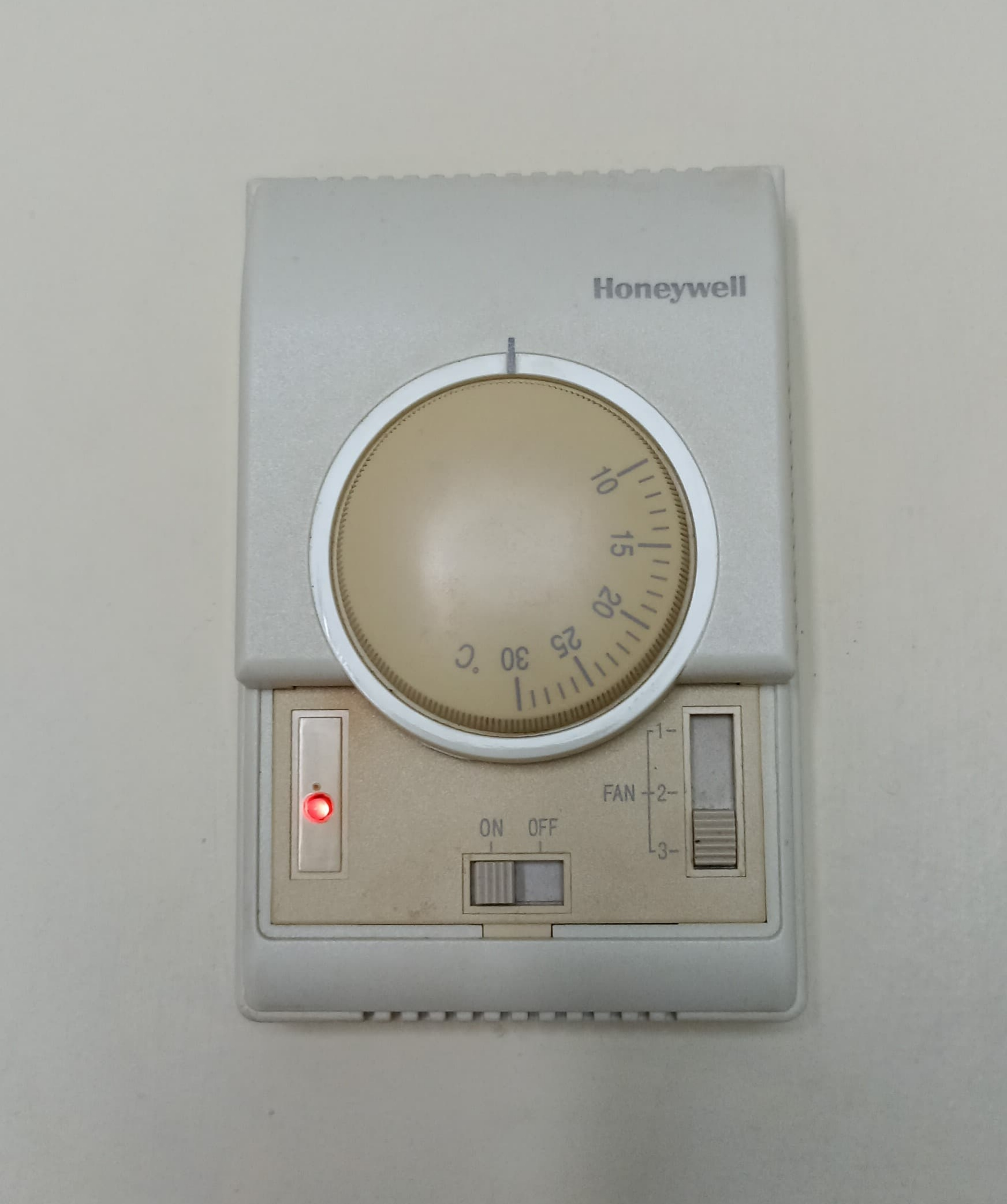
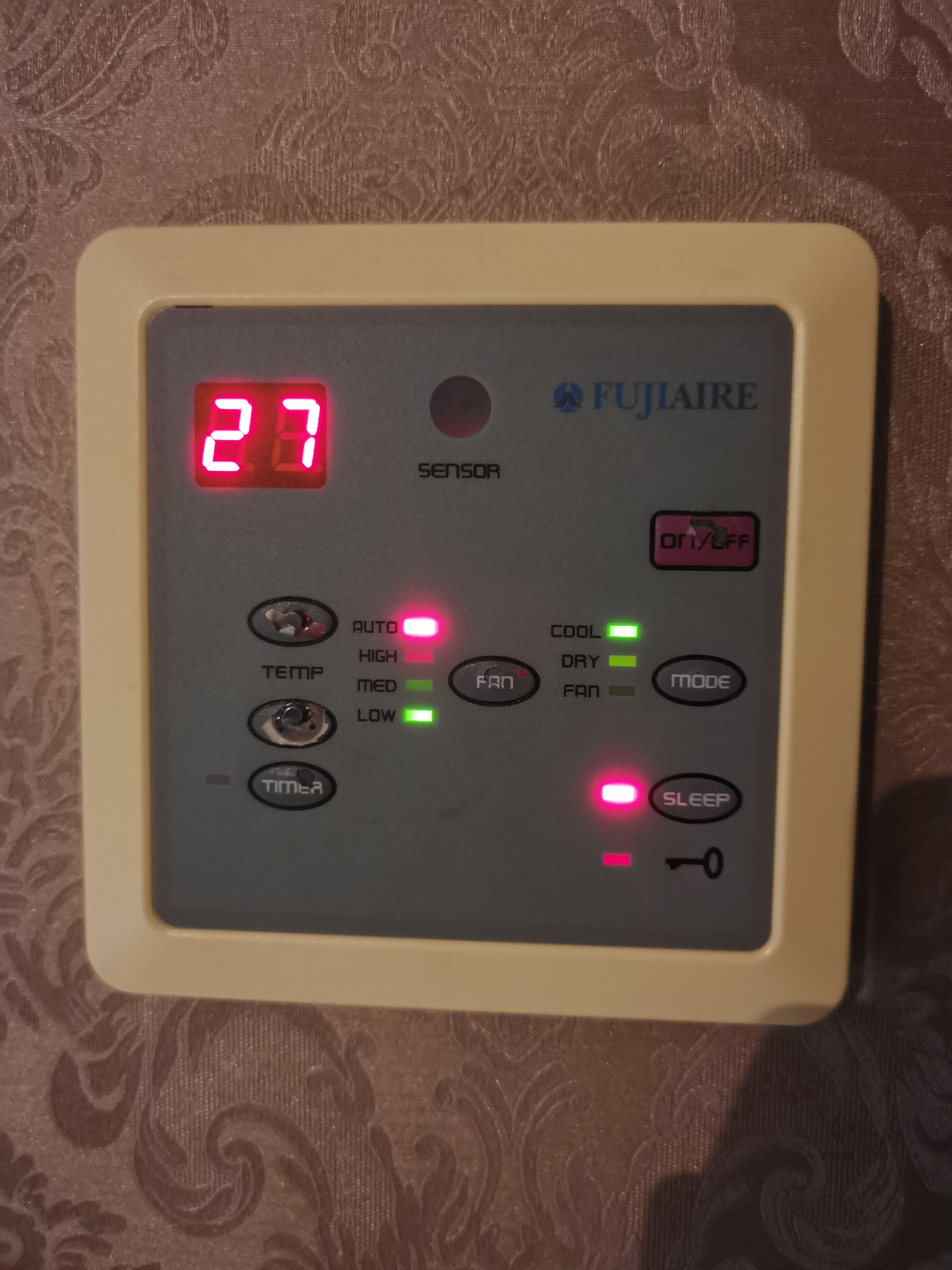
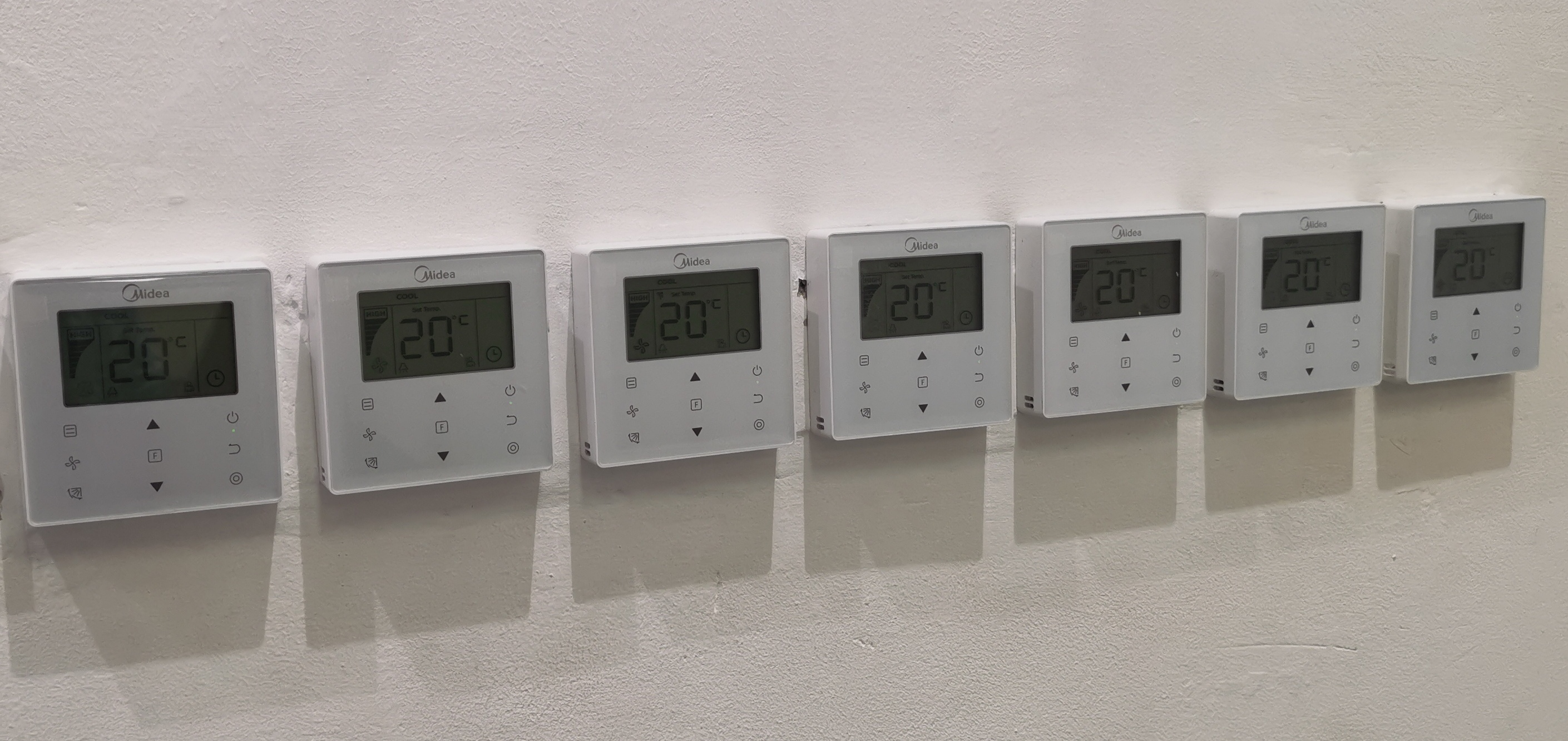
Several wired controllers (Indonesia, 2024)

A wired controller, also called a "wired thermostat", is a device that controls an air conditioner by switching heating or cooling on or off. It uses different sensors to measure temperatures and actuate control operations. Mechanical thermostats commonly use bimetallic strips, converting a temperature change into mechanical displacement, to actuate control of the air conditioner. Electronic thermostats, instead, use a thermistor or other semiconductor sensor, processing temperature change as electronic signals to control the air conditioner.

These controllers are usually used in apartments, hospitals, offices and hotel rooms, because they are permanently installed into a wall and hard-wired directly into the air conditioner unit, eliminating the need for batteries.

== Types ==
Types	Typical Capacity*	Air supply	Mounting	Typical application
Mini-split	small – large	Direct	Wall	Residential
Window	very small – small	Direct	Window	Residential
Portable	very small – small	Direct / Ducted	Floor	Residential, remote areas
Ducted (individual)	small – very large	Ducted	Ceiling	Residential, commercial
Ceiling suspended	medium – large	Direct	Ceiling	Commercial
Ducted (central)	medium – very large	Ducted	Ceiling	Residential, commercial
Cassette	medium – large	Direct / Ducted	Ceiling	Commercial
Floor standing	medium – large	Direct / Ducted	Floor	Commercial
Packaged	very large	Direct / Ducted	Floor	Commercial
Packaged RTU (Rooftop Unit)	very large	Ducted	Rooftop	Commercial

* where the typical capacity is in kilowatt as follows:

- very small: <1.5 kW
- small: 1.5–3.5 kW
- medium: 4.2–7.1 kW
- large: 7.2–14 kW
- very large: >14 kW

=== Mini-split and multi-split systems ===
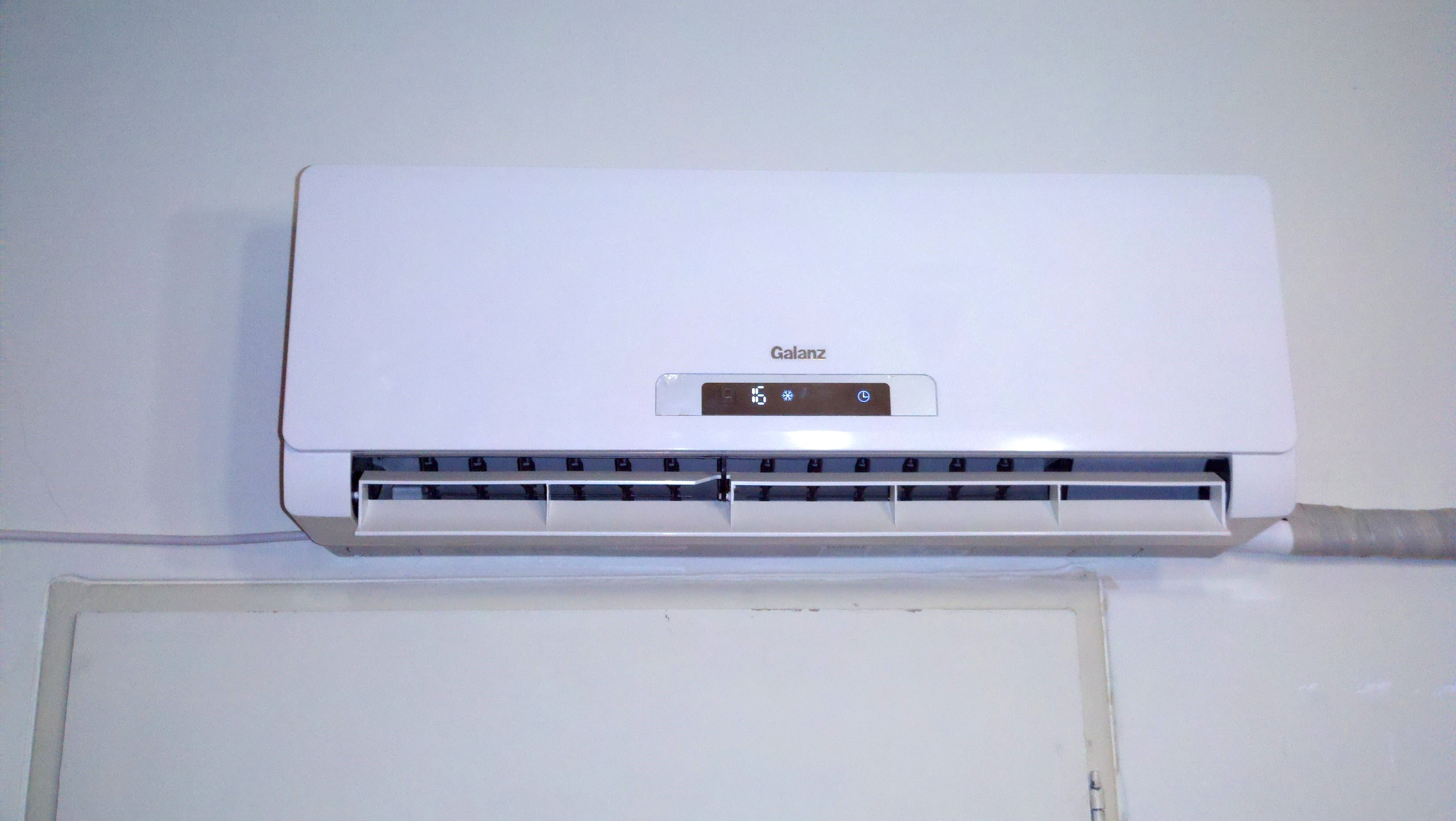
Evaporator, indoor unit, or terminal, side of a ductless split-type air conditioner

Ductless systems (often mini-split, though there are now ducted mini-split) typically supply conditioned and heated air to a single or a few rooms of a building, without ducts and in a decentralized manner. Multi-zone or multi-split systems are a common application of ductless systems and allow up to eight rooms (zones or locations) to be conditioned independently from each other, each with its indoor unit and simultaneously from a single outdoor unit.

The first mini-split system was sold in 1961 by Toshiba in Japan, and the first wall-mounted mini-split air conditioner was sold in 1968 in Japan by Mitsubishi Electric, where small home sizes motivated their development. The Mitsubishi model was the first air conditioner with a cross-flow fan. In 1969, the first mini-split air conditioner was sold in the US. Multi-zone ductless systems were invented by Daikin in 1973, and variable refrigerant flow systems (which can be thought of as larger multi-split systems) were also invented by Daikin in 1982. Both were first sold in Japan. Variable refrigerant flow systems when compared with central plant cooling from an air handler, eliminate the need for large cool air ducts, air handlers, and chillers; instead cool refrigerant is transported through much smaller pipes to the indoor units in the spaces to be conditioned, thus allowing for less space above dropped ceilings and a lower structural impact, while also allowing for more individual and independent temperature control of spaces. The outdoor and indoor units can be spread across the building. Variable refrigerant flow indoor units can also be turned off individually in unused spaces. The lower start-up power of VRF's DC inverter compressors and their inherent DC power requirements also allow VRF solar-powered heat pumps to be run using DC-providing solar panels.

=== Ducted central systems ===
Split-system central air conditioners consist of two heat exchangers, an outside unit (the condenser) from which heat is rejected to the environment and an internal heat exchanger (the evaporator, or Fan Coil Unit, FCU) with the piped refrigerant being circulated between the two. The FCU is then connected to the spaces to be cooled by ventilation ducts. Floor standing air conditioners are similar to this type of air conditioner but sit within spaces that need cooling. Compared to central chilled water systems described below, this is also known as direct expansion systems, because the evaporator heat exchanger is in direct contact with the air of the space being cooled, and no chilled water or brine is used.

=== Central plant cooling ===
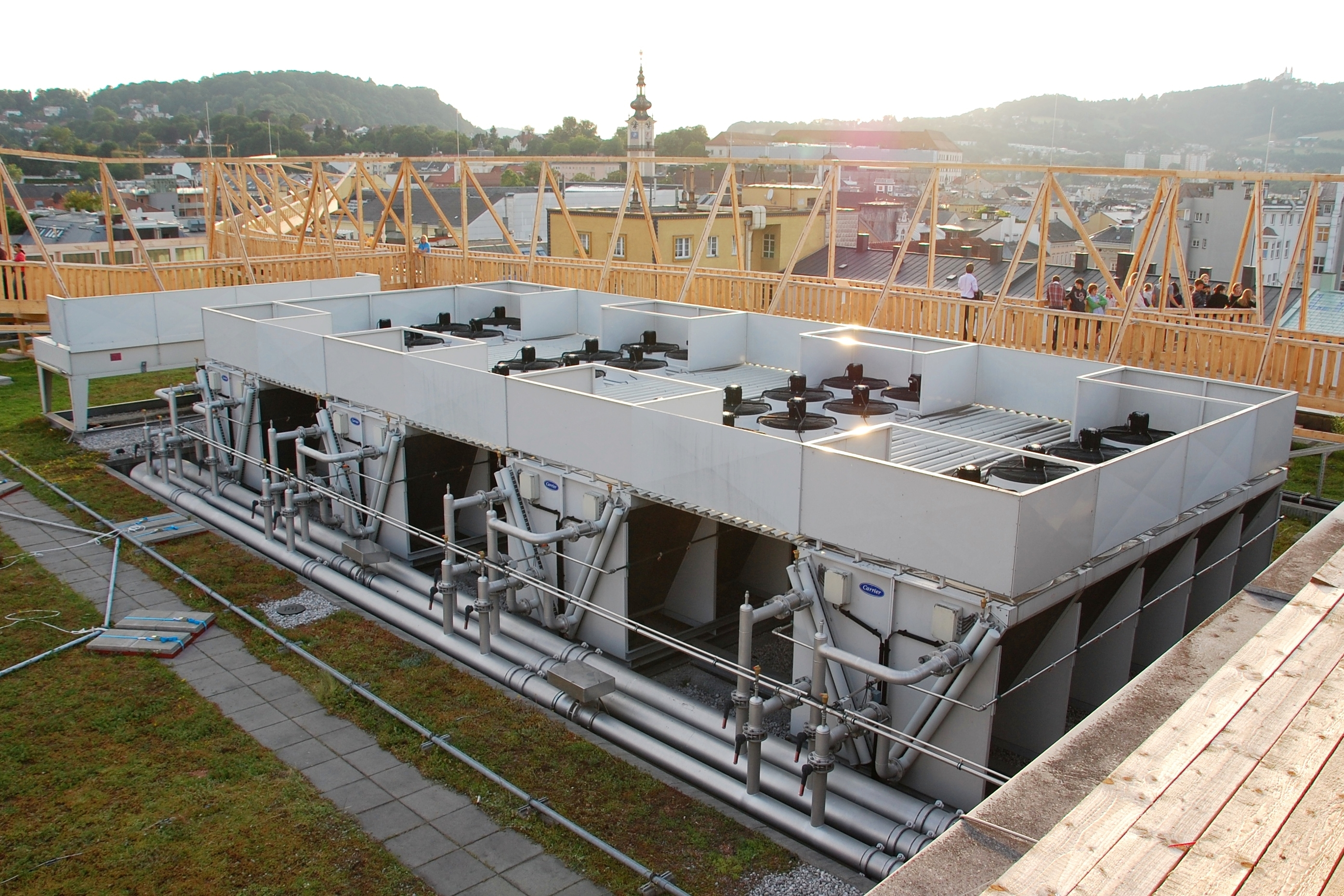
Industrial air cooled chillers on top of the shopping mall Passage in Linz, Austria

Large central cooling plants may use intermediate coolant such as chilled water pumped into air handlers or fan coil units near or in the spaces to be cooled which then duct or deliver cold air into the spaces to be conditioned, instead of ducting cold air directly to these spaces from the plant, which is not done due to the low density and heat capacity of air, which would require impractically large ducts. The chilled water is cooled by chillers in the plant, which uses a refrigeration cycle to cool water, often transferring its heat to the atmosphere in air-cooled or even in liquid-cooled chillers through the use of cooling towers. Then the chilled water is pumped through thermally insulated piping to air handling units or fan coil units, near the spaces to be cooled. Inside, the water passes through a heat exchanger similarly to the evaporator in a split air conditioner or rooftop air conditioner. Then the air can be routed into the spaces directly or through ducting.

=== Portable units ===
A portable system has an indoor unit on wheels connected to an outdoor unit via flexible pipes, similar to a permanently fixed installed unit (such as a ductless split air conditioner).

Hose systems, which can be monoblock or air-to-air, are vented to the outside via air ducts. The monoblock type collects the water in a bucket or tray and stops when full. The air-to-air type re-evaporates the water, discharges it through the ducted hose, and can run continuously. Many but not all portable units draw indoor air and expel it outdoors through a single duct, negatively impacting their overall cooling efficiency.

Many portable air conditioners come with heat as well as a dehumidification function.

=== Window unit and packaged terminal ===
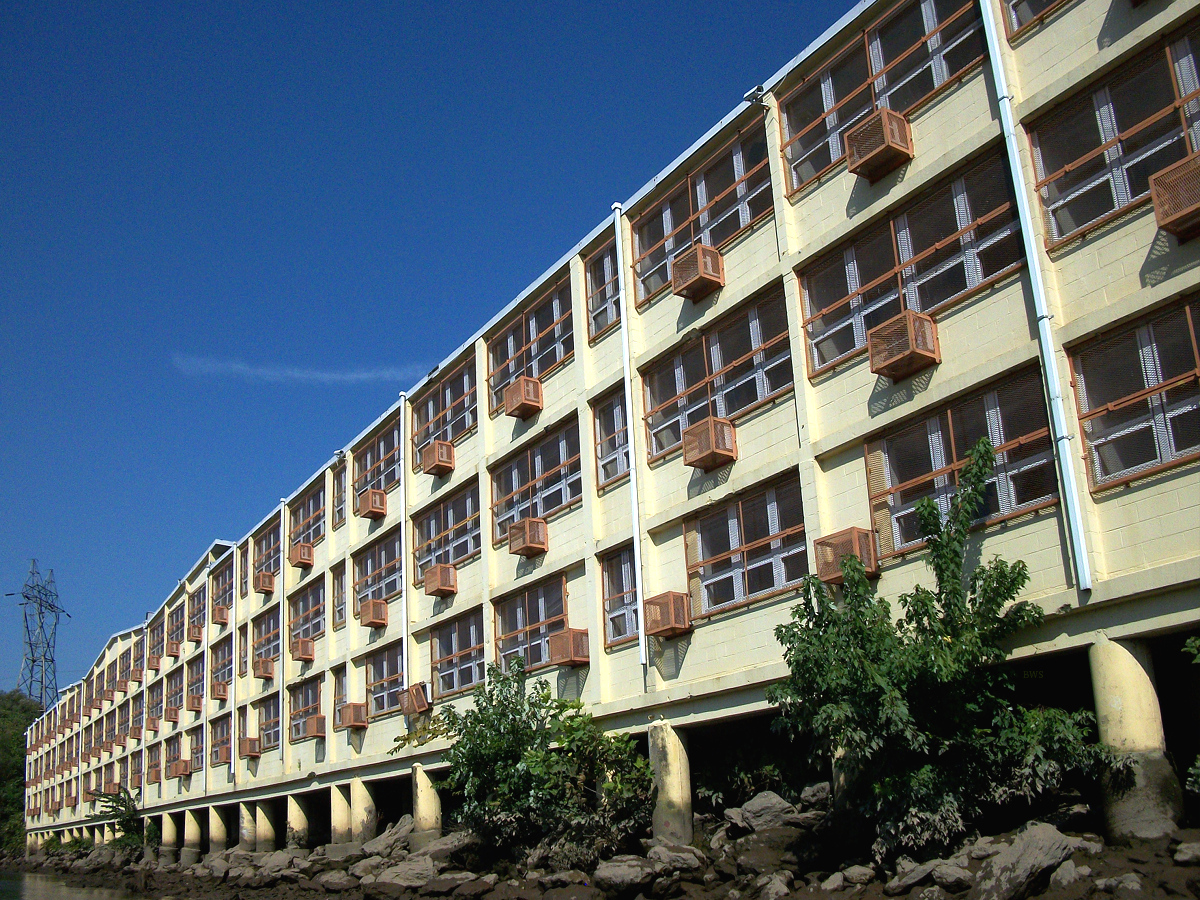
Through-the-wall PTAC units, University Motor Inn, Philadelphia

The packaged terminal air conditioner (PTAC), through-the-wall, and window air conditioners are similar. These units are installed on a window frame or on a wall opening. The unit usually has an internal partition separating its indoor and outdoor sides, which contain the unit's condenser and evaporator, respectively. PTAC systems may be adapted to provide heating in cold weather, either directly by using an electric strip, gas, or other heaters, or by reversing the refrigerant flow to heat the interior and draw heat from the exterior air, converting the air conditioner into a heat pump. They may be installed in a wall opening with the help of a special sleeve on the wall and a custom grill that is flush with the wall and window air conditioners can also be installed in a window, but without a custom grill.

=== Packaged air conditioner ===
Packaged air conditioners (also known as self-contained units) are central systems that integrate into a single housing all the components of a split central system, and deliver air, possibly through ducts, to the spaces to be cooled. Depending on their construction the units may be kept outdoors or indoors; draw the air to be conditioned from inside or outside a building and be water or air-cooled. Outdoor units are air-cooled or water cooled using a cooling tower while indoor units are air cooled.

== Types of compressors ==
Compressor types	Common applications	Typical capacity	Efficiency	Durability	Repairability
Reciprocating	Refrigerator, Walk-in freezer, portable air conditioners, residential mini split and multi split, as well as central ducted.	small – large	very low (small capacity) medium (large capacity)	very low	medium
Rotary vane	Residential mini splits	small	low	low	easy
Scroll	Commercial and central systems, VRF	medium	medium	medium	easy
Rotary screw	Commercial chiller	medium – large	medium	medium	hard
Centrifugal	Commercial chiller	very large	medium	high	hard
Maglev Centrifugal	Commercial chiller	very large	high	very high	very hard

=== Reciprocating ===
This compressor consists of a crankcase, crankshaft, piston rod, piston, piston ring, cylinder head and valves.

=== Scroll ===
This compressor uses two interleaving scrolls to compress the refrigerant. it consists of one fixed and one orbiting scrolls. This type of compressor is more efficient because it has 70 percent less moving parts than a reciprocating compressor.

=== Screw ===
This compressor use two very closely meshing spiral rotors to compress the gas. The gas enters at the suction side and moves through the threads as the screws rotate. The meshing rotors force the gas through the compressor, and the gas exits at the end of the screws. The working area is the inter-lobe volume between the male and female rotors. It is larger at the intake end, and decreases along the length of the rotors until the exhaust port. This change in volume is the compression.

== Capacity modulation technologies ==
There are several ways to modulate the cooling capacity in refrigeration or air conditioning and heating systems. The most common in air conditioning are: on-off cycling, hot gas bypass, use or not of liquid injection, manifold configurations of multiple compressors, mechanical modulation (also called digital), and inverter technology.

=== Hot gas bypass ===
Hot gas bypass involves injecting a quantity of gas from discharge to the suction side. The compressor will keep operating at the same speed, but due to the bypass, the refrigerant mass flow circulating with the system is reduced, and thus the cooling capacity is also reduced. This naturally causes the compressor to run uselessly during the periods when the bypass is operating. The turn down capacity varies between 0 and 100%.

=== Manifold configurations ===
Several compressors can be installed in the system to provide the peak cooling capacity. Each compressor can run or not in order to stage the cooling capacity of the unit. The turn down capacity is either 0/33/66 or 100% for a trio configuration and either 0/50 or 100% for a tandem.

=== Mechanically modulated compressor ===
This internal mechanical capacity modulation is based on periodic compression process with a control valve, the two scroll set move apart stopping the compression for a given time period. This method varies refrigerant flow by changing the average time of compression, but not the actual speed of the motor. Despite an excellent turndown ratio – from 10 to 100% of the cooling capacity, mechanically modulated scrolls have high energy consumption as the motor continuously runs.

=== Variable-speed compressor ===
This system uses a variable-frequency drive (also called an Inverter) to control the speed of the compressor. The refrigerant flow rate is changed by the change in the speed of the compressor. The turn down ratio depends on the system configuration and manufacturer. It modulates from 15 or 25% up to 100% at full capacity with a single inverter from 12 to 100% with a hybrid tandem. This method is the most efficient way to modulate an air conditioner's capacity.

== Impact ==
=== Health effects ===
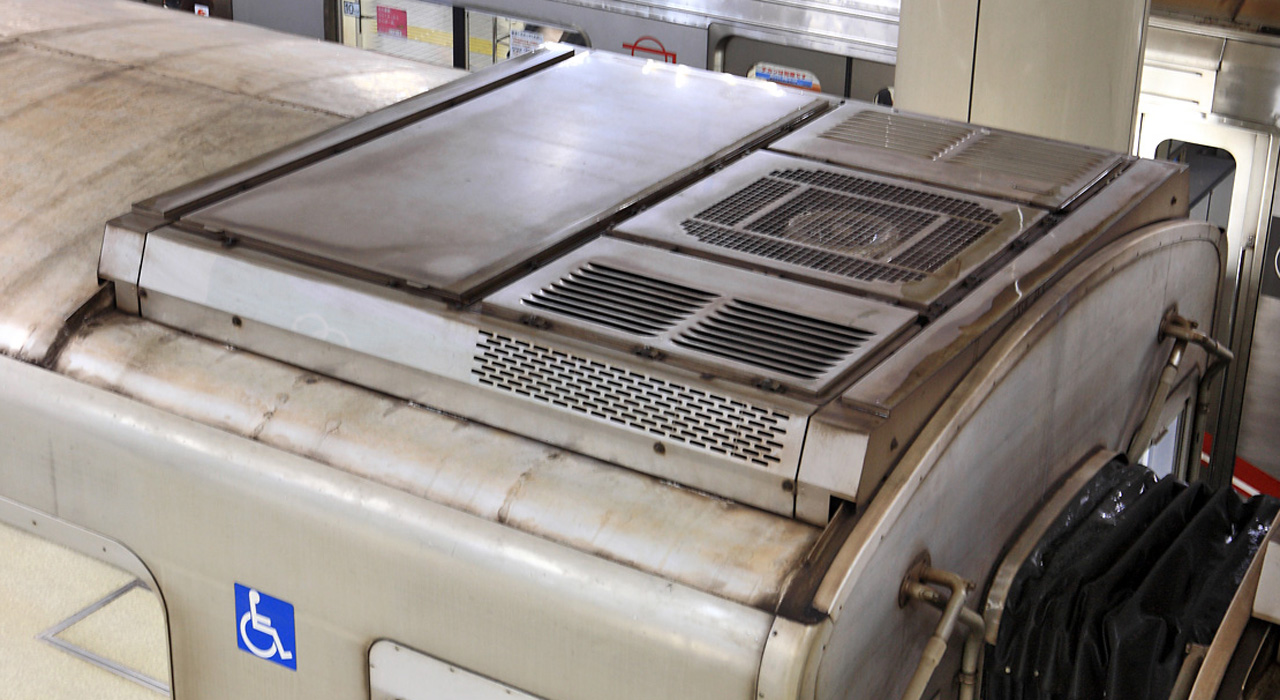
Rooftop condenser unit fitted on top of an Osaka Municipal Subway 10 series subway carriage. Air conditioning has become increasingly prevalent on public transport vehicles to for the comfort and health of passengers and drivers.

In hot weather, air conditioning can prevent heat stroke, dehydration due to excessive sweating, electrolyte imbalance, kidney failure, and other issues due to hyperthermia. Heat waves are the most lethal type of weather phenomenon in the United States. A 2020 study found that areas with lower use of air conditioning correlated with higher rates of heat-related mortality and hospitalizations. The August 2003 France heatwave resulted in approximately 15,000 deaths, where 80% of the victims were over 75 years old. In response, the French government required all retirement homes to have at least one air-conditioned room at 25 °C (77 °F) per floor during heatwaves.

A 2021 report estimated that around 345,000 people aged 65 and older died in 2019 from the heat, which is preventable with air conditioning. An estimated 190,000 heat-related deaths are averted annually owing to air conditioning.

Air conditioning (including filtration, humidification, cooling and disinfection) can be used to provide a clean, safe, hypoallergenic atmosphere in hospital operating rooms and other environments where proper atmosphere is critical to patient safety and well-being. It is sometimes recommended for home use by people with allergies, especially mold. However, poorly maintained water cooling towers can promote the growth and spread of microorganisms such as Legionella pneumophila, the infectious agent responsible for Legionnaires' disease. As long as the cooling tower is kept clean (usually by means of a chlorine treatment), these health hazards can be avoided or reduced. The state of New York has codified requirements for registration, maintenance, and testing of cooling towers to protect against Legionella.

=== Economic effects ===
First designed to benefit targeted industries such as the press as well as large factories, the invention quickly spread to public agencies and administrations with studies with claims of increased productivity close to 24% in places equipped with air conditioning.

Air conditioning contributed to the economic development of the American South after the 1950s by enabling industrial activities in hot climates and supporting the expansion of white-collar work in cooled office spaces. It also influenced urban sprawl and commuting patterns, as air-conditioned vehicles made suburban development more viable. Historians rank air conditioning among key factors shaping postwar metropolitan growth, alongside highways, automobiles, shopping malls, and suburban housing.

Air conditioning caused various shifts in demography, notably that of the United States starting from the 1970s. In the US, the birth rate was lower in the spring than during other seasons until the 1970s but this difference then declined since then. As of 2007, the Sun Belt contained 30% of the total US population while it was inhabited by 24% of Americans at the beginning of the 20th century. Moreover, the summer mortality rate in the US, which had been higher in regions subject to a heat wave during the summer, also evened out.

The spread of the use of air conditioning acts as a main driver for the growth of global demand of electricity. According to a 2018 report from the International Energy Agency (IEA), it was revealed that the energy consumption for cooling in the United States, involving 328 million Americans, surpasses the combined energy consumption of 4.4 billion people in Africa, Latin America, the Middle East, and Asia (excluding China). A 2020 survey found that an estimated 88% of all US households use AC, increasing to 93% when solely looking at homes built between 2010 and 2020.

=== Environmental effects ===
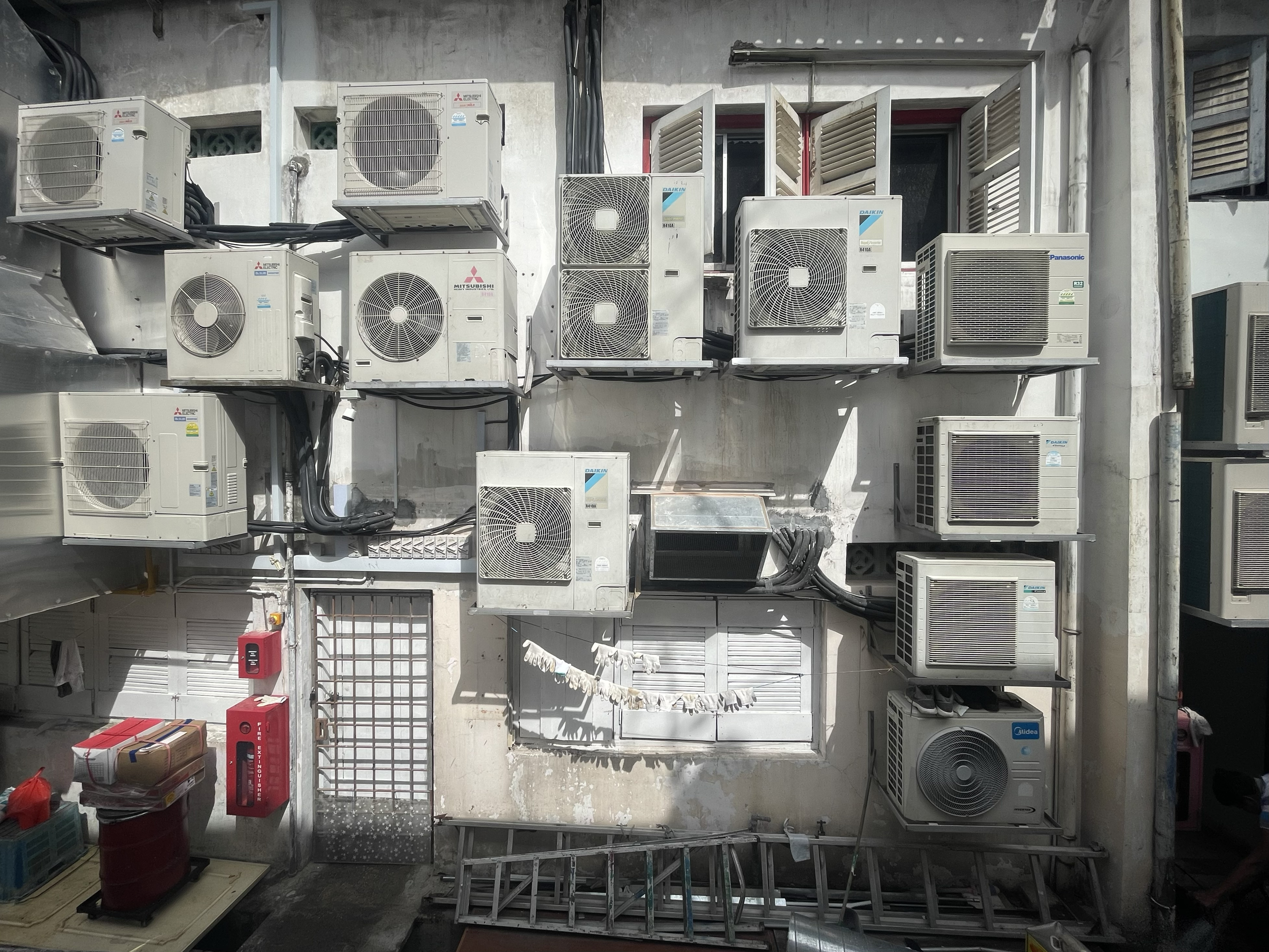
Air conditioner farm in the facade of a building in Singapore

Air conditioning used about 7% of global electricity in 2022, and emitted 3% of greenhouse gas. In 2025, data from household surveys from 25 countries reported that owning air conditioners increased average household electricity consumption by about 36%. Findings showed the effect was related to weather conditions, income, and country. A 2018 report on air conditioning efficiency by the International Energy Agency predicted an increase of electricity usage due to space cooling to around 6200 TWh by 2050, and that with the progress currently seen, greenhouse gas emissions attributable to space cooling would double from 1,135 million tons (2016) to 2,070 million tons. There is some push to increase the energy efficiency of air conditioners. United Nations Environment Programme (UNEP) and the IEA found that if air conditioners could be twice as effective as now, 460 billion tons of GHG could be cut over 40 years. The UNEP and IEA also recommended legislation to decrease the use of hydrofluorocarbons, better building insulation, and more sustainable temperature-controlled food supply chains going forward.

Refrigerants have also caused and continue to cause serious environmental issues, including ozone depletion and climate change, as several countries have not yet ratified the Kigali Amendment to reduce the consumption and production of hydrofluorocarbons. CFCs and HCFCs refrigerants such as R-12 and R-22, respectively, used within air conditioners have caused damage to the ozone layer, and hydrofluorocarbon refrigerants such as R-410A and R-404A, which were designed to replace CFCs and HCFCs, are instead exacerbating climate change. Both issues happen due to the venting of refrigerant to the atmosphere, such as during repairs. HFO refrigerants, used in some if not most new equipment, solve both issues with an ozone damage potential (ODP) of zero and a much lower global warming potential (GWP) in the single or double digits vs. the three or four digits of hydrofluorocarbons.

Hydrofluorocarbons would have raised global temperatures by around 0.3–0.5 °C (0.5–0.9 °F) by 2100 without the Kigali Amendment. With the Kigali Amendment, the increase of global temperatures by 2100 due to hydrofluorocarbons is predicted to be around 0.06 °C (0.1 °F).

Air conditioning units also contribute to pollution as they are difficult to disassemble or repair. Separating metal and plastic at the end of a unit's life cycle is also costly and not practical, meaning units are frequently disposed of.

Several journalists say it is an air conditioning paradox that arises from the usage of air conditioners to adapt to the effects of climate change, leading to higher energy consumption and heat generation as a byproduct, thereby exacerbating the problem.

==== Mitigation of some environmental drawbacks ====
Alternatives are currently being explored by governments and researchers, such as more energy-efficient systems, passive cooling techniques, and the development of low-GWP refrigerants. However, balancing the demand for cooling with the need to reduce carbon footprints remains a complex and pressing issue.

As renewable energy becomes cheaper and more popular, the energy source of air conditioners is shifting towards more renewable energy sources.

The danger of high-GWP refrigerants, such as HFCs, escaping into the atmosphere and trapping heat can be mitigated through development of low-GWP refrigerants.

=== Social and cultural effects ===
Socioeconomic groups with an annual household income below around $10,000 (circa 2021) tend to have a low rate of air conditioning adoption, which worsens heat-related mortality. The lack of cooling can be hazardous, as areas with lower use of air conditioning correlate with higher rates of heat-related mortality and hospitalizations. Premature mortality in New York City is projected to grow by between 47% and 95% in 30 years, with lower-income and vulnerable populations most at risk. Studies on the correlation between heat-related mortality and hospitalizations and living in low socioeconomic locations can be traced in Phoenix, Arizona; Hong Kong; China; Japan; and Italy. Costs of health care can act as another barrier: the lack of private health insurance during a 2009 heat wave in Australia was associated with heat-related hospitalization.

Disparities in socioeconomic status and access to air conditioning are connected by some to institutionalized racism, which leads to the association of specific marginalized communities with lower economic status, poorer health, residing in hotter neighborhoods, engaging in physically demanding labor, and experiencing limited access to cooling technologies such as air conditioning. A study examining the US cities of Chicago, Detroit, Minneapolis, and Pittsburgh found that black households were half as likely to have central air conditioning units when compared to their white counterparts. Especially in cities, redlining and other historical practices mean that racial disparities are also played out in heat islands, increasing temperatures in certain parts of the city. This is due to heat-absorbing building materials and pavements and lack of vegetation and shade coverage. There have been initiatives that provide cooling solutions to low-income communities, such as public cooling spaces.

Cooling has allowed for growth of indoor home space and has encouraged people, including children, to stay indoors more often. It has also created uniformity of different geographical areas and climate zones.

== Alternative options for cooling ==
Alternatives to continual air conditioning include passive cooling, passive solar cooling, natural ventilation, operating shades to reduce solar gain, using trees, architectural shades, windows (and using window coatings) to reduce solar gain.

Buildings designed with passive air conditioning are generally less expensive to construct and maintain than buildings with conventional HVAC systems with lower energy demands. While tens of air changes per hour, and cooling of tens of degrees, can be achieved with passive methods, site-specific microclimate must be taken into account, complicating building design.

Many techniques can be used to increase comfort and reduce the temperature in buildings. These include evaporative cooling, selective shading, wind, thermal convection, and heat storage.

=== Passive ventilation ===
The ventilation system of a regular earthship

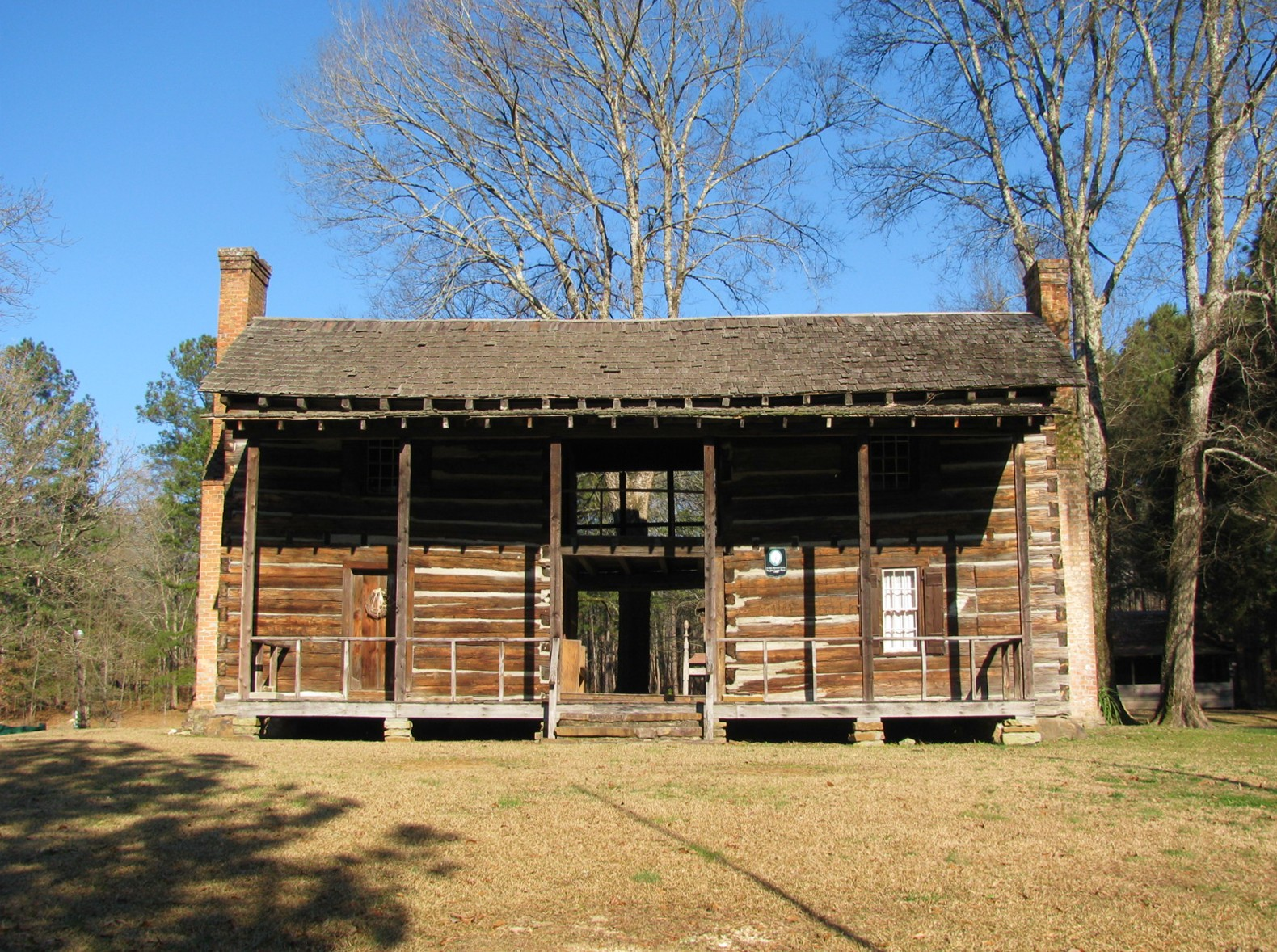
Dogtrot houses are designed to maximize natural ventilation.

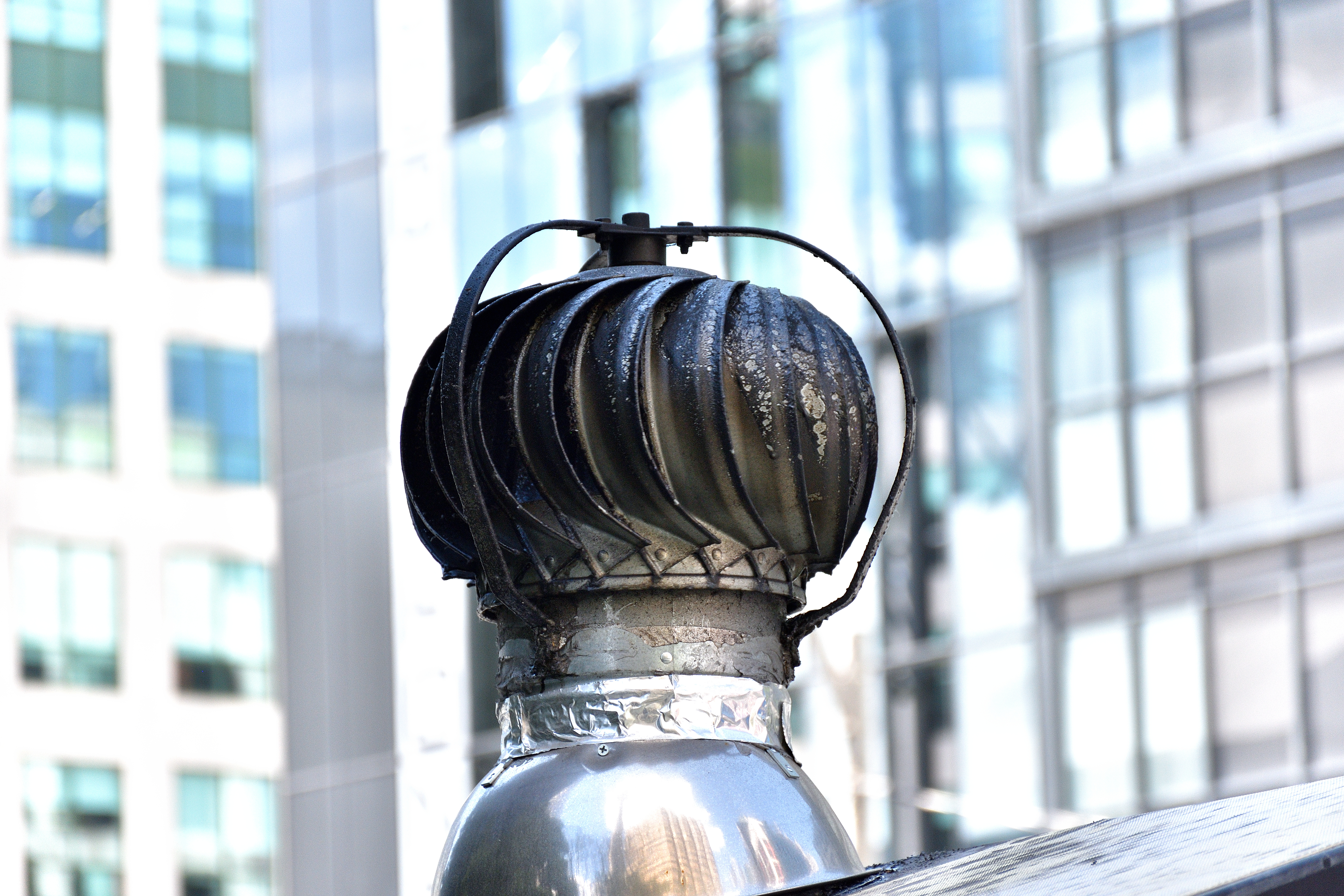
A roof turbine ventilator, colloquially known as a 'Whirly Bird', is an application of wind driven ventilation.

Passive ventilation is the process of supplying air to and removing air from an indoor space without using mechanical systems. It refers to the flow of external air to an indoor space as a result of pressure differences arising from natural forces.

There are two types of natural ventilation occurring in buildings: wind driven ventilation and buoyancy-driven ventilation. Wind driven ventilation arises from the different pressures created by wind around a building or structure, and openings being formed on the perimeter which then permit flow through the building. Buoyancy-driven ventilation occurs as a result of the directional buoyancy force that results from temperature differences between the interior and exterior.

Since the internal heat gains which create temperature differences between the interior and exterior are created by natural processes, including the heat from people, and wind effects are variable, naturally ventilated buildings are sometimes called "breathing buildings".

=== Natural solutions ===
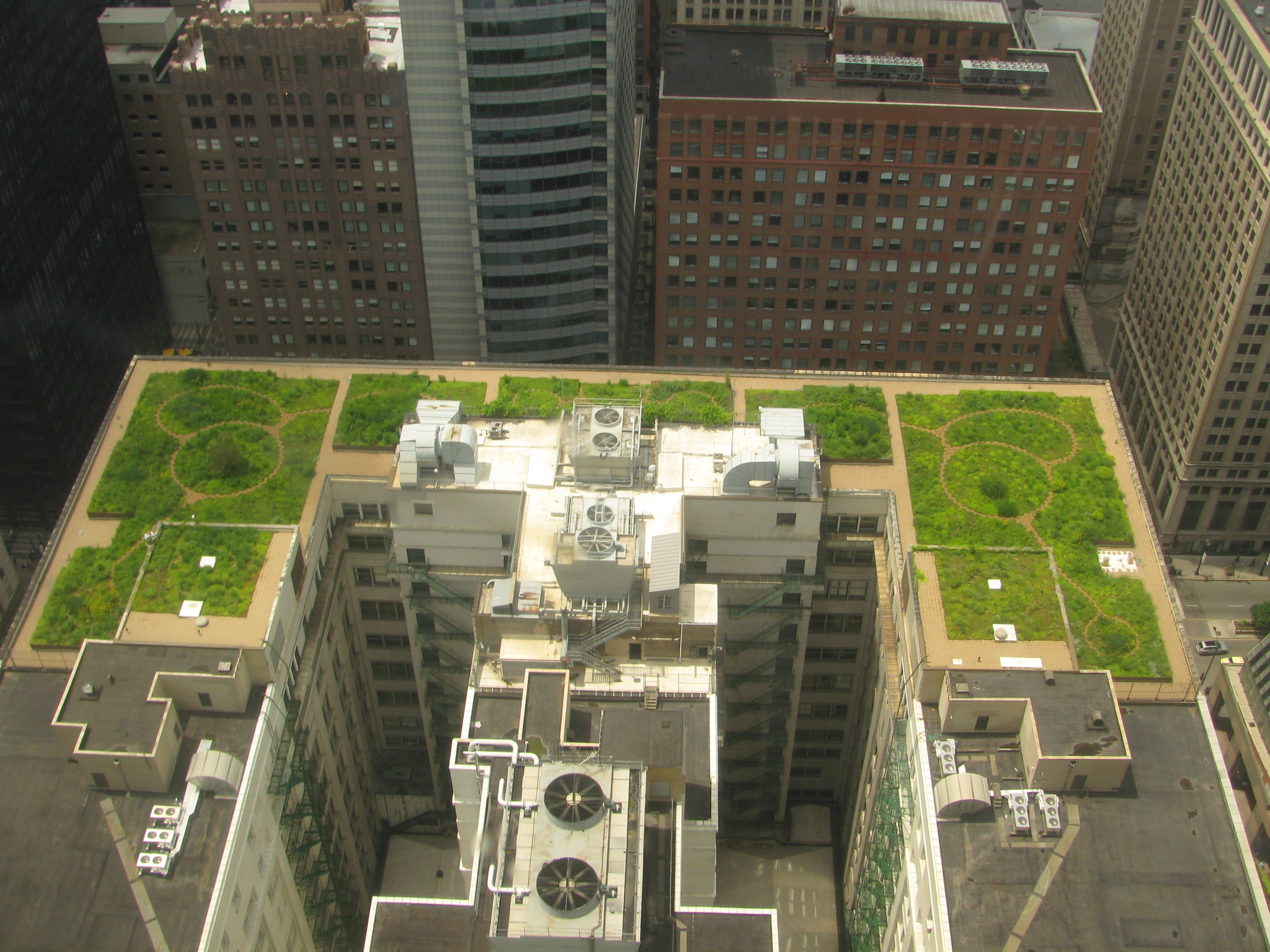
The Chicago City Hall's green roof

Natural solutions do not require energy for cooling purposes, and are therefore a very attractive solution. Many ways to achieve this have been explored.

The structure of a building can help dissipate heat. For example, in Zimbabwe, Eastgate Development cut its energy use by 90% by utilizing termite mound inspired structures.

Coverage of windows can help reduce internal heat gain from sunlight. The U.S. Department of Energy estimates that window awnings can lower internal heat gain from sunlight by up to 77%.

The coating of roofs have also seen great success. In the United States, painting roofs white has been shown to lower roof temperatures by as much as 30 °C. Meanwhile, in China, a project involving the installation of green roofs — roofs covered with vegetation — not only reduced the cooling demands of buildings, but also lowered the average land surface temperature in the area by 0.91 °C.

Planting trees can also help mitigate the heat island effect. A study in Europe discovered that tree cover can reduce land surface temperatures in cities by as much as 12 °C during the summer. In the United States, another study found that when tree cover reaches 40%, ground-level temperatures were lowered by nearly 6 °C.

=== Passive cooling ===
A traditional Iranian solar cooling design using a wind tower

Passive cooling is a building design approach that focuses on heat gain control and heat dissipation in a building in order to improve the indoor thermal comfort with low or no energy consumption. This approach works either by preventing heat from entering the interior (heat gain prevention) or by removing heat from the building (natural cooling).

Natural cooling utilizes on-site energy, available from the natural environment, combined with the architectural design of building components (e.g. building envelope), rather than mechanical systems to dissipate heat. Therefore, natural cooling depends not only on the architectural design of the building but on how the site's natural resources are used as heat sinks (i.e. everything that absorbs or dissipates heat). Examples of on-site heat sinks are the upper atmosphere (night sky), the outdoor air (wind), and the earth/soil.

Passive cooling is an important tool for design of buildings for climate change adaptation – reducing dependency on energy-intensive air conditioning in warming environments.

Passive cooling covers all natural processes and techniques of heat dissipation and modulation without the use of energy. Some authors consider that minor and simple mechanical systems (e.g. pumps and economizers) can be integrated in passive cooling techniques, as long they are used to enhance the effectiveness of the natural cooling process. Such applications are also called 'hybrid cooling systems'. The techniques for passive cooling can be grouped in two main categories:

- Preventive techniques that aim to provide protection and/or prevention of external and internal heat gains.
- Modulation and heat dissipation techniques that allow the building to store and dissipate heat gain through the transfer of heat from heat sinks to the climate. This technique can be the result of thermal mass or natural cooling.

A pair of short windcatchers (malqaf) used in traditional architecture; wind is forced down on the windward side and leaves on the leeward side (cross-ventilation). In the absence of wind, the circulation can be driven with evaporative cooling in the inlet (which is also designed to catch dust). In the center, a shuksheika (roof lantern vent), used to shade the qa'a below while allowing hot air rise out of it (stack effect).

=== Daytime radiative cooling ===
Passive daytime radiative cooling (PDRC) surfaces reflect incoming solar radiation and heat back into outer space through the infrared window for cooling during the daytime. Daytime radiative cooling became possible with the ability to suppress solar heating using photonic structures, which emerged through a study by Raman et al. (2014). PDRCs can come in a variety of forms, including paint coatings and films, that are designed to be high in solar reflectance and thermal emittance.

PDRC applications on building roofs and envelopes have demonstrated significant decreases in energy consumption and costs. In suburban single-family residential areas, PDRC application on roofs can potentially lower energy costs by 26% to 46%. PDRCs are predicted to show a market size of ~$27 billion for indoor space cooling by 2025 and have undergone a surge in research and development since the 2010s.

=== Fan ===
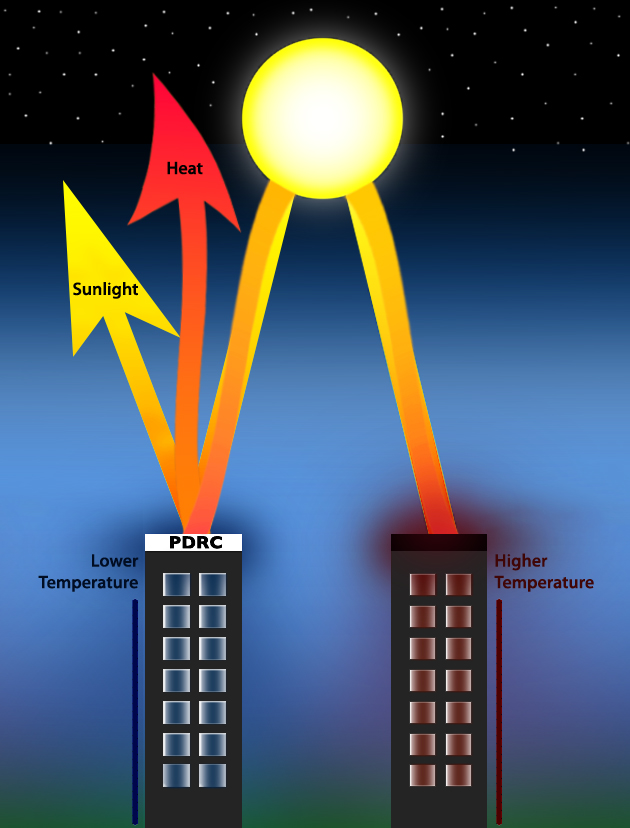
Passive daytime radiative cooling (PDRC) surfaces are high in solar reflectance and heat emittance, cooling with zero energy use or pollution.

Hand fans have existed since prehistory. Large human-powered fans built into buildings include the punkah.

The Chinese inventor Ding Huan (1st century CE) of the Han dynasty invented a rotary fan for air conditioning, with seven wheels 3 m (10 ft) in diameter and manually powered by prisoners. In 747, Emperor Xuanzong (r. 712–762) of the Tang dynasty (618–907) had the Cool Hall (Liang Dian 涼殿) built in the imperial palace, which the Tang Yulin describes as having water-powered fan wheels for air conditioning as well as rising jet streams of water from fountains. During the subsequent Song dynasty (960–1279), written sources mentioned the air conditioning rotary fan as even more widely used.

=== Thermal buffering ===
In areas that are cold at night or in winter, heat storage is used. Heat may be stored in earth or masonry; air is drawn past the masonry to heat or cool it.

In areas that are below freezing at night in winter, snow and ice can be collected and stored in ice houses for later use in cooling. This technique is over 3,700 years old in the Middle East. Harvesting outdoor ice during winter and transporting and storing for use in summer was practiced by wealthy Europeans in the early 1600s, and became popular in Europe and the Americas towards the end of the 1600s. This practice was replaced by mechanical compression-cycle icemakers.

=== Evaporative cooling ===
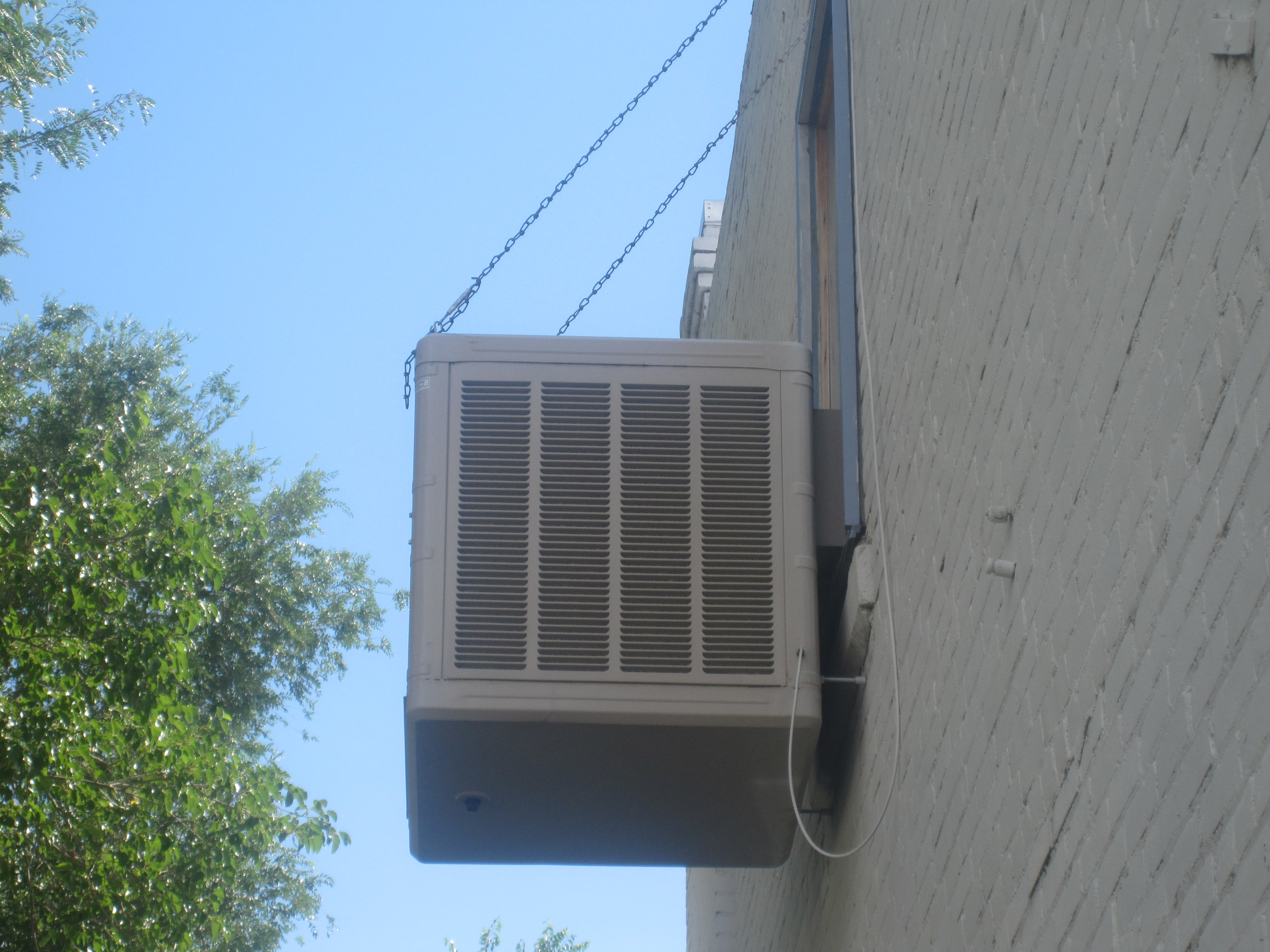
An evaporative cooler

In dry, hot climates, the evaporative cooling effect may be used by placing water at the air intake, such that the draft draws air over water and then into the house. For this reason, it is sometimes said that the fountain, in the architecture of hot, arid climates, is like the fireplace in the architecture of cold climates. Evaporative cooling also makes the air more humid, which can be beneficial in a dry desert climate.

Evaporative coolers tend to feel as if they are not working during times of high humidity, when there is not much dry air with which the coolers can work to make the air as cool as possible for dwelling occupants. Unlike other types of air conditioners, evaporative coolers rely on the outside air to be channeled through cooler pads that cool the air before it reaches the inside of a house through its air duct system; this cooled outside air must be allowed to push the warmer air within the house out through an exhaust opening such as an open door or window.

== Political debate ==
There is a political controversy about air conditioning, especially in South Asia, partly due to the cost of electricity, unit prices, and the cost for governments to upgrade electrical grids. There have been protests against power cuts in India, Pakistan and Bangladesh.

Europe is getting hotter faster than other continents, and in the 2020s Europe suffered many deaths due to the lack of air conditioning: less than a quarter of households had it. Air conditioning is an important part of adapting to climate change.

In the United States, where air conditioning is widely adopted, political energy revolves around inequality in who has access to air conditioning. Air conditioning is also viewed as a necessity in Southeast Asia. But as green policies move forward, local discussions are now focusing on how to set the right temperature and exactly when or how many people are needed to turn it on. Meanwhile, in Northeast Asian countries with four distinct seasons, newer HVAC technology that generates heat in winter and functions as air conditioning in summer have drawn significant attention. While governments claim it is necessary to phase out inefficient cooling units and kerosene heaters, whether society can bear the costs of mandatory upgrades for environmental causes has also become a focal point of public debate. In South American countries like Venezuela, electricity is often rationed. This leads to mandatory decreases in air conditioning usage due to its power draw, which is met with controversy.

== See also ==
- Air filter
- Air purifier
- Cleanroom
- Crankcase heater
- Energy recovery ventilation
- Indoor air quality
- Particulates
