= Freeze stat =

Temperature sensing device

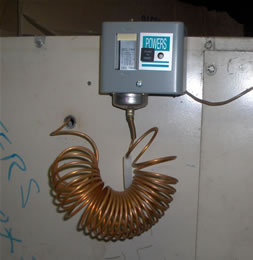
Air coil freeze stat

A freeze stat is a temperature sensing device for HVAC that monitors a heat exchanger to prevent its coils from freezing. Freeze stats can be used on both refrigerant-to-air and refrigerant-to-liquid type heat exchangers and serve different purposes with similar goals for each.

== Air coil ==
The purpose of an air coil freeze stat is to keep the refrigerant-to-air heat exchanger (commonly called air coils) from freezing. This kind of freeze stat is typically used for heating coils which are exposed to outside air and is usually installed on the supply air side of the coil. To accomplish this, they typically shut down the flow of outside air to a mixing box when the temperature reaches a predetermined setpoint. The setpoint for air coil freeze stats is typically about 12 °C which is approximately when the dew point temperature of the air starts to drop below freezing point.

== Water coil ==
The water coil freeze stat performs a similar function to the air coil freeze stat, but is used on a different type of HVAC system. Its function is to keep the freon-to-liquid heat exchanger (commonly called liquid coils) from freezing.

In practical situations, when an air coil freeze stat is not used, bypassed, or defeated, the air coil can freeze, and this causes a lack of air flow to the facility. By contrast, when a water coil freeze stat is not used, the water coil can get so cold that it can freeze the cooling liquid in the exchanger and burst the exchanger. A ruptured heat exchanger mixes contaminants such as freon and oil into the coolant. The intrusion of coolant into the delicately balanced refrigeration system can cause expensive damage to components such as the freon compressor, and the reversing valve.

== Mechanical ==
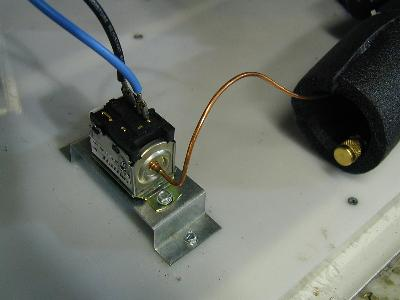
Mechanical freeze stat

Conceptually, mechanical freeze stats are constructed with a diaphragm, a capillary tube and bulb, and an electric switch. The capillary tube allows gas movement to and from the capillary bulb and the diaphragm with a fall or rise in temperature, respectively. When the temperature reaches a specific setpoint, the pressure in the diaphragm will trip a switch which typically shuts down the flow of outside air while the capillary bulb's temperature is at or below the setpoint. Mechanical freeze stats can have more than one set of contacts, and the contacts can be NO or NC.
Disadvantages

- Capillary tube easily kinked during installation limiting effectiveness
- Sensing bulb must be mounted horizontally
- Diaphragm case must be mounted in a separate, warmer location for effective operation

Advantages

- Typically inexpensive
- Easily understood wiring

== Digital ==
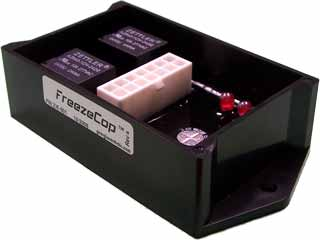
Digital freeze stat

Digital freeze stats, also known as electronic or solid state freeze stats, use an electronic circuit, microprocessor, or microcontroller in place of the mechanical freeze stat's diaphragm and switch. They also use one or more electric or electronic sensors in place of the capillary tube and bulb for temperature sensing. Digital freeze stats utilizing microcontrollers or microprocessors can also perform more advanced functions than simply opening or closing switch contacts. Digital freeze stats can perform seemingly intelligent operations such as reversing the refrigerant flow and using some building heat to thaw a freon-to-liquid heat exchanger and then restoring the refrigerant flow to its normal direction once the danger of freezing the water coil has been averted.
Disadvantages

- Requires power to operate
- Typically higher cost than mechanical freeze stats
- More complex wiring installation

Advantages

- Multiple sensors
- Sensors can be near or far
- No capillary tube kinking issue
- No capillary tube leaking issue
- Operate in any position
- Operate in varying temperatures
- Programmable actions and setpoints
- Can perform functions other than opening or closing a single switch

== See also ==
- Crankcase heater
- Heat exchanger
- Reversing valve
- Thermal expansion valve
- Thermostat
