= Crankcase heater =

Electrical component of HVAC systems

A crankcase heater is an electrical component in a compressor in an air-conditioning system, heat pump system, or chiller system. The crankcase heater is normally on all the time, even when the unit is not running, though temperature sensors and set points may turn it off when not needed. A crankcase heater's sole purpose is to prevent refrigerant migration and mixing with crankcase oil when the unit is off, and to prevent condensation of refrigerant in the crankcase of a compressor. The crankcase heater keeps refrigerant at a temperature higher than the coldest part of the system. A crankcase heater generally has the same electrical symbol as a resistor because it converts electricity directly into heat via electrical resistance. The resistance in the heater coil determines the heat it produces when voltage is applied.

== Installation ==
Some air conditioning equipment manufacturers install crankcase heaters either in the compressor (insertion type), or mount them externally around the base of the compressor (bellyband type). The two wires of the heater are wired directly to the input side of the contact from the main power supply, and power is always supplied to the heater. Caution should be used since the heater can become very hot and cause second degree burns as well as cause electrical danger due to live circuits.

== Start-up ==
Most manufacturers of air conditioning require that the heater be energized for 24 hours before system start-up. The compressor must have crankcase heat before start-up or damage occurs to the compressor. The pressure on the crankcase always drops when the compressor starts to turn.

== Operation ==
While the system is running, there is enough heat being generated by the compressor running to prevent refrigerant migration from occurring. Refrigerant vapor always migrates to the coldest part of the system (the compressor). The refrigerant migrates to the compressor crankcase where it is attracted to the compressor oil. This refrigerant vapor condenses and returns to a liquid in the off cycle. On the next start of the compressor, the oil is in a watery state and washes the bearings out, which leads to locked-up, frozen or totally burnt-out compressors. The temperature is sensed at the compressor, indoor coil, and outdoors. The sensed temperatures are compared and if the compressor temperature is not a specified amount higher than the lower of the other two sensed temperatures, then the crankcase heater is energized. When the compressor temperature rises to or is a specified amount above the lower of the other two temperatures, the crankcase heater is de-energized.

Crankcase heat is common in air conditioning (cooling) systems where R-22 has been used for many years. The home owner often shuts off the disconnect to the outdoor condensing unit for the winter, leaving the compressor without crankcase heat. If the homeowner then starts the unit without some time for the heat to boil the refrigerant out the oil, damage likely occurs to the compressor. On start-up, the crankcase pressure reduces as soon as the compressor starts to turn. The refrigerant boils and turns the oil to foam. The oil and refrigerant (some of the refrigerant may be in liquid state) is pumped out of the compressor. Valve and bearing damage may occur and the compressor may be operated with a limited oil charge until it returns to the crankcase from the evaporator.

Refrigeration compressors typically operate all seasons and do not have this seasonal shutdown, but if they are shut down for a period of time, the preceding situation occurs, so it is likely that crankcase heat will become popular.

== See also ==
- Freeze stat
