= Reversing valve =

Valve that reverses flow direction in part of a circuit

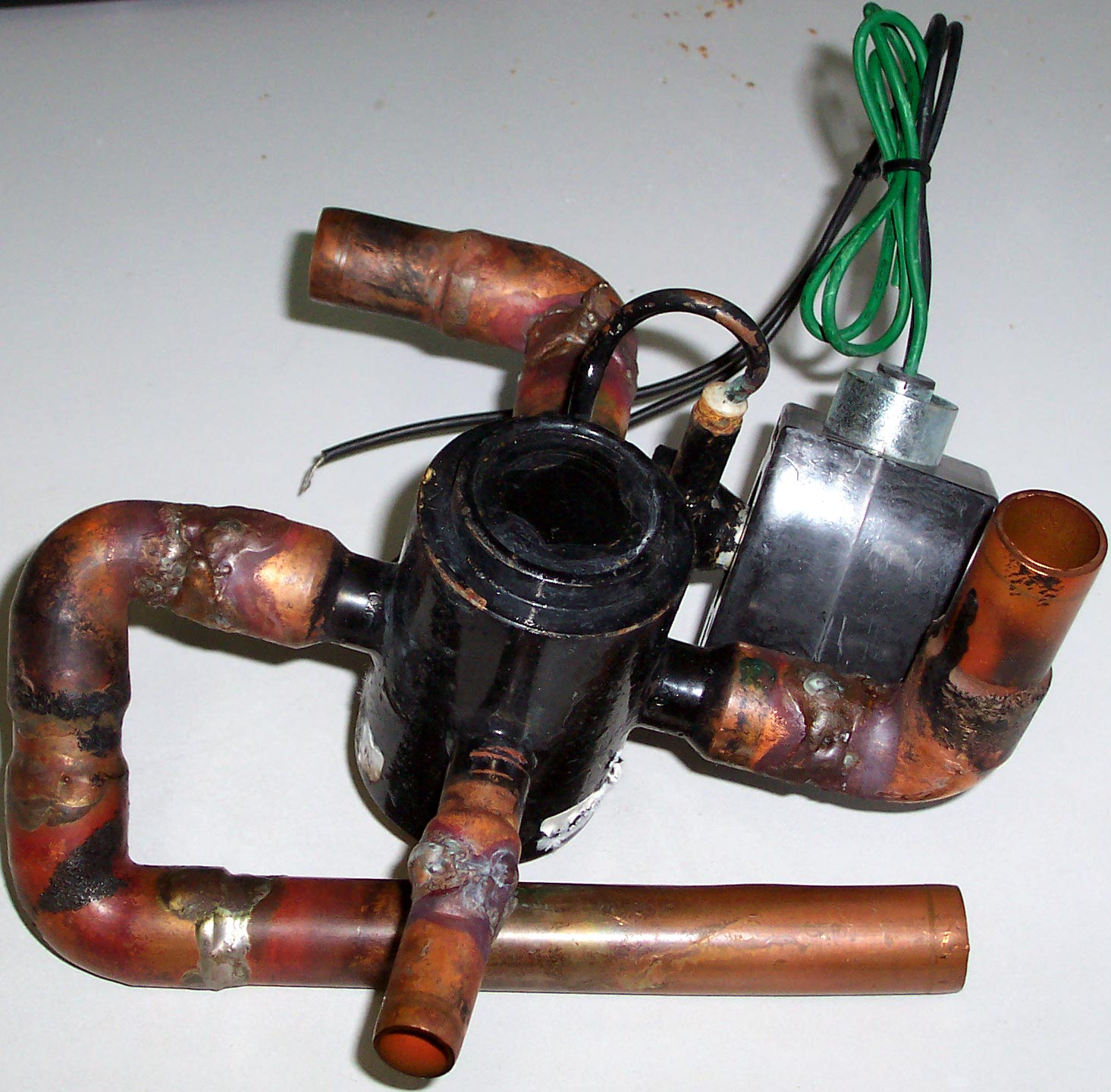
A reversing valve removed from an HVAC heat pump for replacement

A reversing valve is a type of valve and is a component in a heat pump, that changes the direction of refrigerant flow. By reversing the flow of refrigerant, the heat pump refrigeration cycle is changed from cooling to heating or vice versa. This allows a residence or facility to be heated and cooled by a single piece of equipment, by the same means, and with the same hardware.

== Operation ==
The reversing valve has two states, relaxed (unactivated) versus energized. The energized state is typically achieved by applying an alternate voltage of 24 volts, which is commonly used in HVAC equipment. The heat pump can be designed by the manufacturer to produce either cooling or heating with the reversing valve in the relaxed state. When the reversing valve is energized, the system will transfer heat in the direction opposite to that which occurs with the valve in the unactivated state. For example, a reversing valve installed in such a way as to produce cooling when relaxed will produce heating when energized. Likewise, a reversing valve installed to produce heating when relaxed will produce cooling when energized.

== Control ==
Depending on the construction and use of the heat pump, the reversing valve may be driven by the heat pump through the use of a defrost control board, or it may be driven directly by a thermostat (typically from the "O" terminal of the thermostat).

== Replacement ==
Reversing valves are built into the heat pump by the manufacturer, and must be replaced by an HVAC technician if they fail. Since the valve is an integral part of the sealed refrigerant circuit, proper procedures for recovering and then later refilling the refrigerant must be followed, to prevent its loss into the atmosphere.

== See also ==
- Thermostat
- Thermal expansion valve
- Freeze stat
