= Central heating =

Type of heating system

A condensing boiler

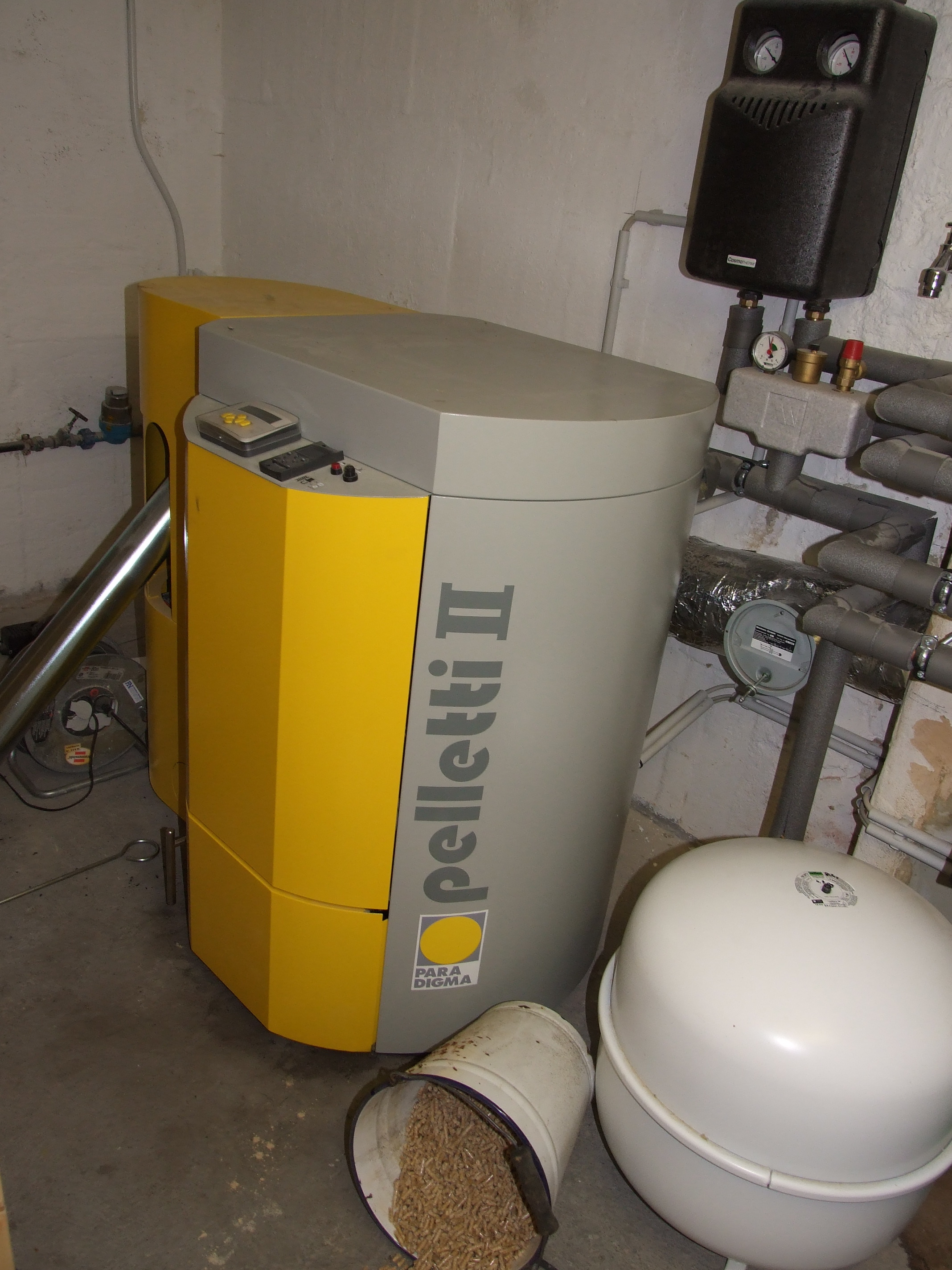
Hot water central heating unit, using wood as fuel

A central heating system provides warmth to a number of spaces within a building from one main source of heat. Most central heating systems use a furnace that converts fuel or electricity to heat through various processes, although some systems use a heat pump that transfers heat inside from the outdoors in lieu of or in addition to a furnace. The heat is circulated through the building either by fans forcing heated air through ducts, circulation of low-pressure steam to radiators in each heated room, or pumps that circulate hot water through room radiators. Primary energy sources may be fuels like coal or wood, oil, kerosene, natural gas, or electricity.

Compared with systems such as fireplaces and wood stoves, a central heating system offers improved uniformity of temperature control over a building, usually including automatic control of the furnace. Large homes or buildings may be divided into individually controllable zones with their own temperature controls. Automatic fuel (and sometimes ash) handling provides improved convenience over separate fireplaces. Where a system includes ducts for air circulation, central air conditioning can be incorporated, yielding a heating, ventilation, and air conditioning (HVAC) system. A central heating system may take up considerable space in a home or other building, and may require supply and return ductwork to be installed at the time of construction.

== Overview ==
Central heating differs from space heating in that the heat generation occurs in one place, such as a furnace room or basement in a house or a mechanical room in a large building (though not necessarily at the geometrically "central" point). The heat is distributed throughout the building, typically by forced-air through ductwork, by water circulating through pipes, or by steam fed through pipes. The most common method of heat generation involves the combustion of fossil fuel in a furnace or boiler.

In much of the temperate climate zone, most detached housing has had central heating installed since before the Second World War. Where coal was readily available (e.g. the anthracite coal region in northeast Pennsylvania in the United States) coal-fired steam or hot water systems were common. Later in the 20th century, these were updated to burn fuel oil or gas, eliminating the need for a large coal storage bin near the boiler and the need to remove and discard coal ashes.

A cheaper alternative to hot water or steam heat is forced hot air. A furnace burns fuel oil or gas, which heats air in a heat exchanger, and blower fans circulate the warmed air through a network of ducts to the rooms in the building. This system is cheaper because the air moves through a series of ducts instead of pipes, and does not require a pipe fitter to install. The space between floor joists can be boxed in and used as some of the ductwork, further lowering costs.

The four different generations of district heating systems and their energy sources

Electrical heating systems occur less commonly and are practical only with low-cost electricity or when ground source heat pumps are used. Considering the combined system of thermal power station and electric resistance heating, the overall efficiency will be less than for direct use of fossil fuel for space heating.

Some other buildings utilize central solar heating, in which case the distribution system normally uses water circulation.

Alternatives to such systems are gas heaters and district heating. District heating uses the waste heat from an industrial process or electrical generating plant to provide heat for neighboring buildings. Similar to cogeneration, this requires underground piping to circulate hot water or steam.

== History ==
=== Ancient Korea ===
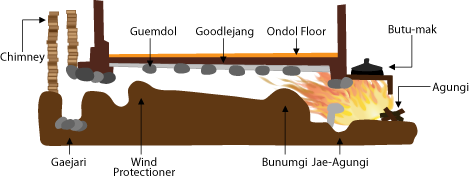
An illustration of the ondol system

Use of the ondol has been found at archaeological sites in present-day North Korea. A Neolithic Age archaeological site, circa 5000 BC, discovered in Sonbong, Rason, in present-day North Korea, shows a clear vestige of gudeul in the excavated dwelling (Korean: 움집).

The main components of the traditional ondol are an agungi (firebox or stove) accessible from an adjoining room (typically kitchen or master bedroom), a raised masonry floor underlain by horizontal smoke passages, and a vertical, freestanding chimney on the opposite exterior wall providing a draft. The heated floor, supported by stone piers or baffles to distribute the smoke, is covered by stone slabs, clay and an impervious layer such as oiled paper.

Early ondols began as gudeul that provided the heating for a home and for cooking. When a fire was lit in the furnace to cook rice for dinner, the flame would extend horizontally because the flue entry was beside the furnace. This arrangement was essential, as it would not allow the smoke to travel upward, which would cause the flame to go out too soon. As the flame would pass through the flue entrance, it would be guided through the network of passages with the smoke. Entire rooms would be built on the furnace flue to create ondol floored rooms.

Ondol had traditionally been used as a living space for sitting, eating, sleeping and other pastimes in most Korean homes before the 1960s. Koreans are accustomed to sitting and sleeping on the floor, and working and eating at low tables instead of raised tables with chairs. The furnace burned mainly rice paddy straws, agricultural crop waste, biomass or any kind of dried firewood. For short-term cooking, rice paddy straws or crop waste was preferred, while long hours of cooking and floor heating needed longer-burning firewood. Unlike modern-day water heaters, the fuel was either sporadically or regularly burned (two to five times a day), depending on frequency of cooking and seasonal weather conditions.

=== Ancient Rome and Greece ===
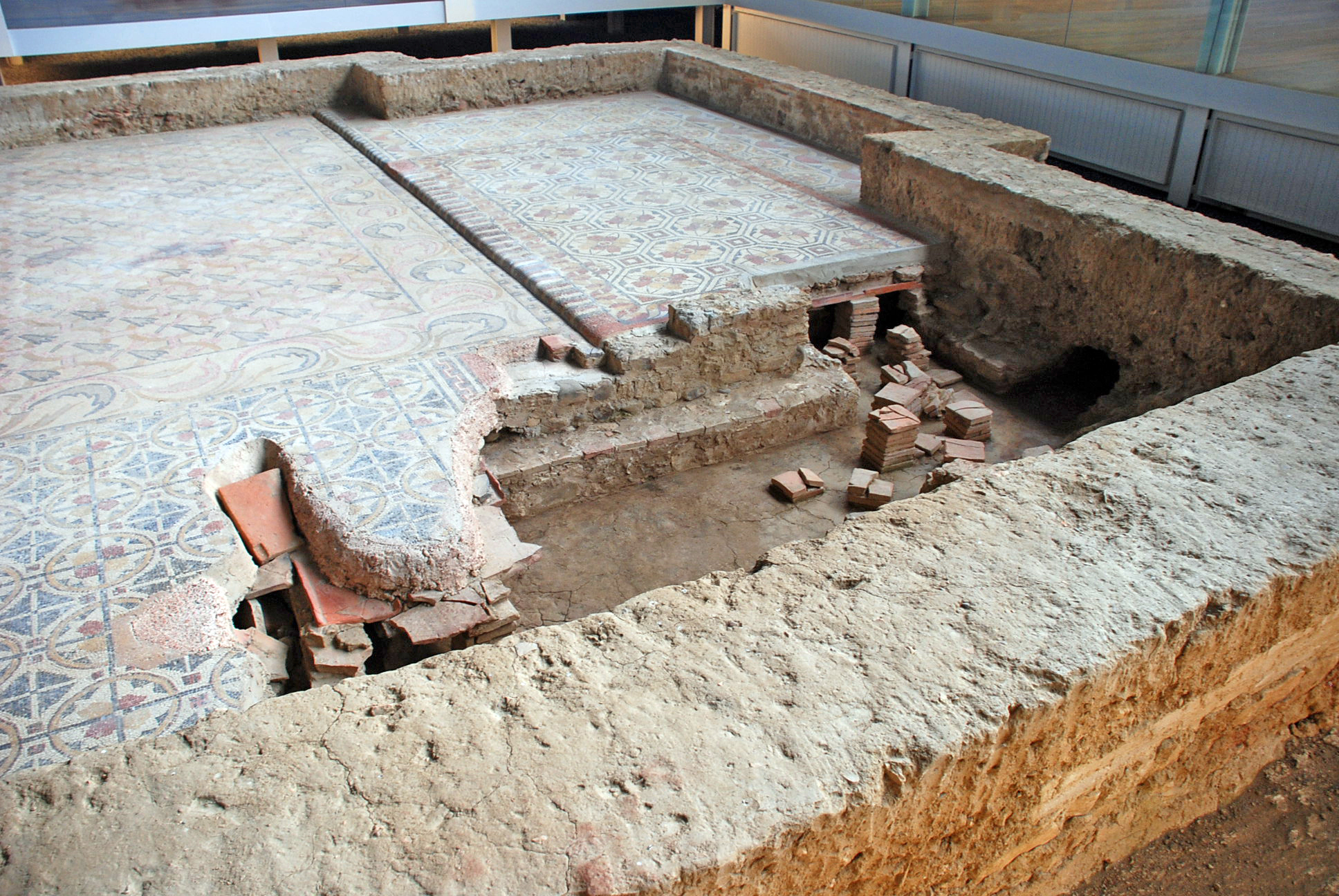
Ruins of the hypocaust under the floor of a Roman villa at La Olmeda, Province of Palencia (Castile and León, Spain)

The ancient Greeks originally developed central heating. The temple of Ephesus was heated by flues planted in the ground and circulating the heat which was generated by fire. Some buildings in the Roman Empire used central heating systems, conducting air heated by furnaces through empty spaces under the floors and out of pipes (called caliducts) in the walls—a system known as a hypocaust.

The Roman hypocaust continued to be used on a smaller scale during late Antiquity and by the Umayyad caliphate, while later Muslim builders employed a simpler system of underfloor pipes.

After the collapse of the Roman Empire, overwhelmingly across Europe, heating reverted to more primitive fireplaces for almost a thousand years.

In the early medieval Alpine upland, a simpler central heating system where heat travelled through underfloor channels from the furnace room replaced the Roman hypocaust at some places. In Reichenau Abbey a network of interconnected underfloor channels heated the 300 m^{2} large assembly room of the monks during the winter months. The degree of efficiency of the system has been calculated at 90%.

In the 13th century, the Cistercian monks revived central heating in Christian Europe using river diversions combined with indoor wood-fired furnaces. The well-preserved Royal Monastery of Our Lady of the Wheel (founded 1202) on the Ebro River in the Aragon region of Spain provides an excellent example of such an application.

=== Modern central heating systems ===
The three main methods of central heating were developed in the late 18th to mid-19th centuries.

==== Hot air ====
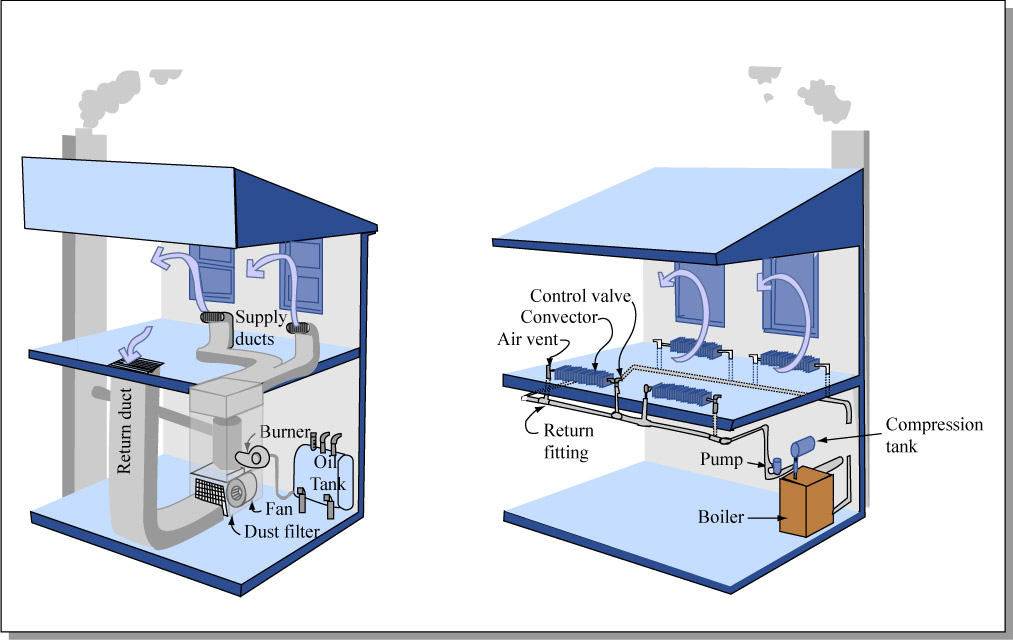
Air-based central heating.

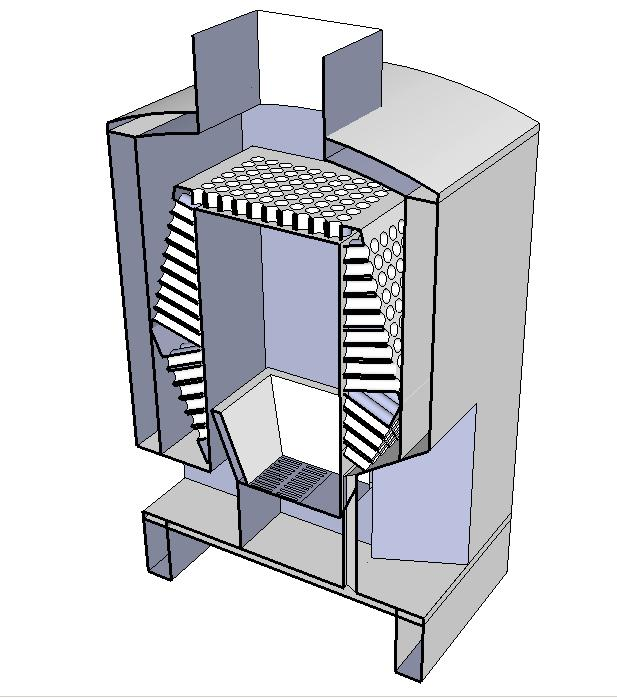
Sylvester's warm-air stove, 1819

William Strutt designed a new mill building in Derby with a central hot air furnace in 1793, although the idea had been already proposed by John Evelyn almost a hundred years earlier. Strutt's design consisted of a large stove that heated air brought from the outside by a large underground passage. The air was ventilated through the building by large central ducts.

In 1807, he collaborated with another eminent engineer, Charles Sylvester, on the construction of a new building to house Derby's Royal Infirmary. Sylvester was instrumental in applying Strutt's novel heating system for the new hospital. He published his ideas in The Philosophy of Domestic Economy; as exemplified in the mode of Warming, Ventilating, Washing, Drying, & Cooking, ... in the Derbyshire General Infirmary in 1819. Sylvester documented the new ways of heating hospitals that were included in the design, and the healthier features such as self-cleaning and air-refreshing toilets. The infirmary's novel heating system allowed the patients to breathe fresh heated air whilst old air was channeled up to a glass and iron dome at the centre.

Their designs proved very influential. They were widely copied in the new mills of the Midlands and were constantly improved, reaching maturity with the work of de Chabannes on the ventilation of the House of Commons in the 1810s. This system remained the standard for heating small buildings for the rest of the century.

==== Steam ====
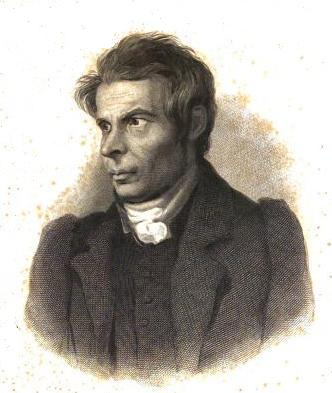
Thomas Tredgold, a noted engineer and authority on central heating systems in the early 19th century

The English writer Hugh Plat proposed a steam-based central heating system for a greenhouse in 1594, although this was an isolated occurrence and was not followed up until the 18th century. Colonel Coke devised a system of pipes that would carry steam around the house from a central boiler, but it was James Watt the Scottish inventor who was the first to build a working system in his house.

A central boiler supplied high-pressure steam that then distributed the heat within the building through a system of pipes embedded in the columns. He implemented the system on a much larger scale at a textile factory in Manchester. Robertson Buchanan wrote the definitive description of these installations in his treatises published in 1807 and 1815. Thomas Tredgold's work Principles of Warming and Ventilating Public Buildings, delineated the method of the application of hot steam heating to smaller, non-industrial buildings. This method had superseded the hot air systems by the late 19th century.

==== Hot water ====
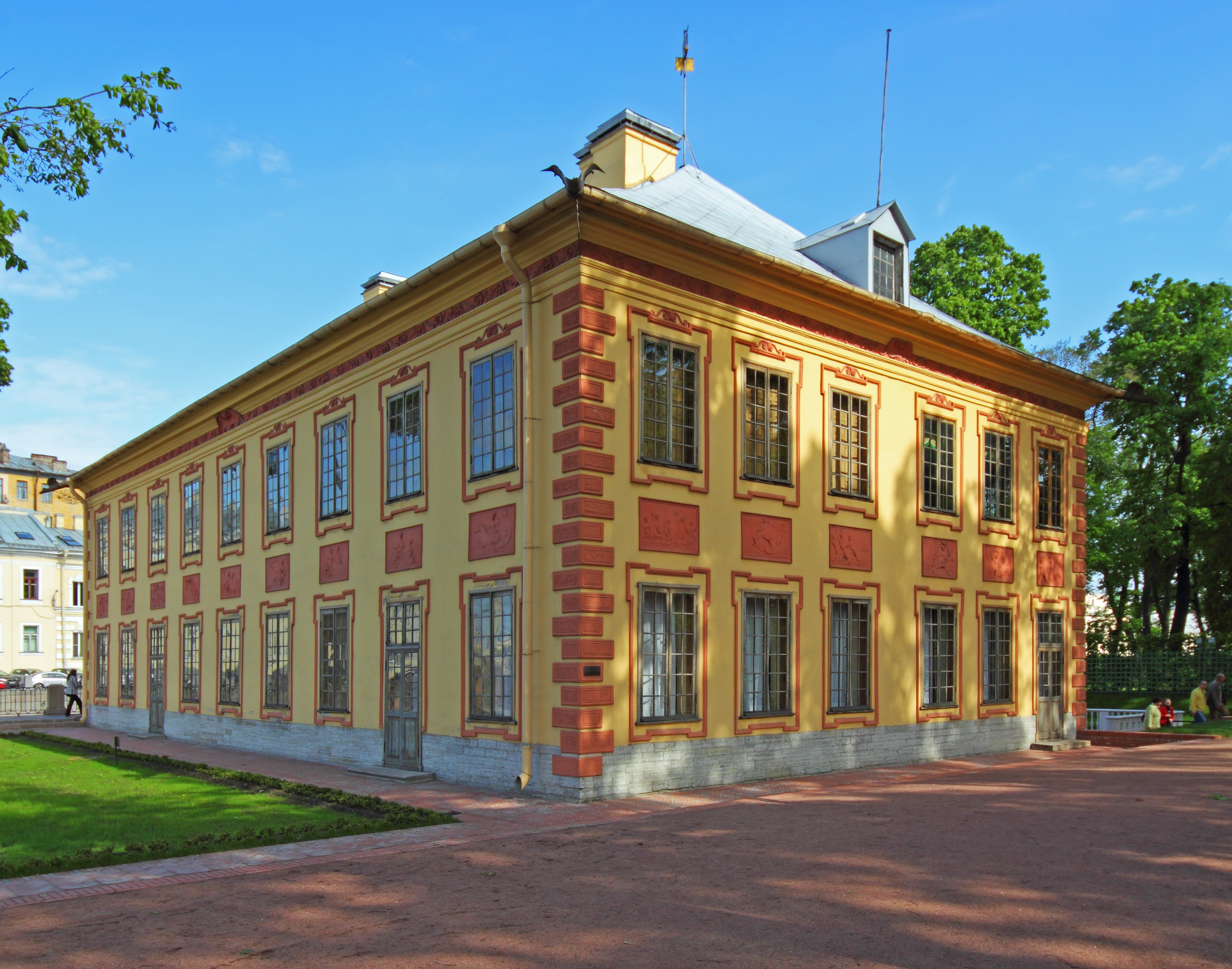
The Summer Palace in St. Petersburg had an early system of hydrologic central heating.

Early hot water systems were used in Ancient Rome for heating the Thermæ. Another early hot water system was developed in Russia for central heating of the Summer Palace (1710–1714) of Peter the Great in Saint Petersburg. Slightly later, in 1716, came the first use of water in Sweden to distribute heating in buildings. Mårten Triewald, a Swedish engineer, used this method for a greenhouse at Newcastle upon Tyne. Jean Simon Bonnemain (1743–1830), a French architect, introduced the technique to industry on a cooperative, at Château du Pêcq, near Paris.

However, these scattered attempts were isolated and mainly confined in their application to greenhouses. Tredgold originally dismissed its use as impractical, but changed his mind in 1836, when the technology went into a phase of rapid development.

Early systems had used low pressure water systems, which required very large pipes. One of the first modern hot water central heating systems to remedy this deficiency was installed by Angier March Perkins in London in the 1830s. At that time central heating was coming into fashion in Britain, with steam or hot air systems generally being used.

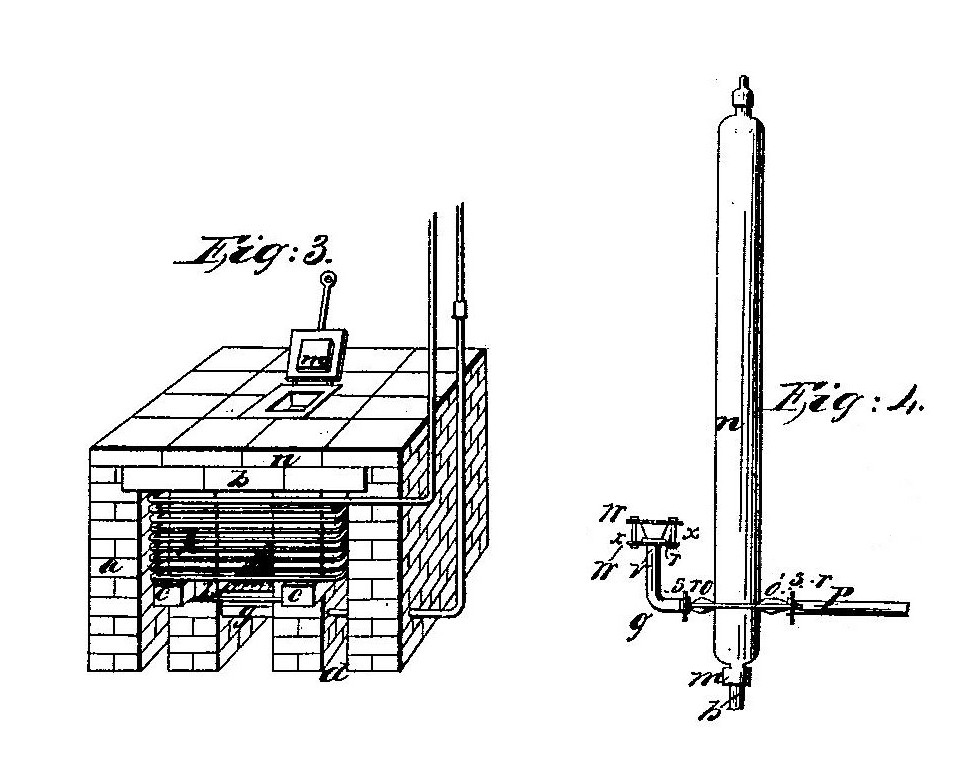
Details of furnace and expansion tube from Perkins' 1838 Patent

Perkins' 1832 apparatus distributed water at 200 degrees Celsius (392 °F) through small diameter pipes at high pressure. A crucial invention to make the system viable was the thread screwed joint, that allowed the joint between the pipes to bear a similar pressure to the pipe itself. He also separated the boiler from the heat source to reduce the risk of explosion. The first unit was installed in the home of Governor of the Bank of England John Horsley Palmer so that he could grow grapes in England's cold climate.

His systems were installed in factories and churches across the country, many of them remaining in usable condition for over 150 years. His system was also adapted for use by bakers in the heating of their ovens and in the making of paper from wood pulp.

Franz San Galli, a Prussian-born Russian businessman living in St. Petersburg, invented the radiator between 1855 and 1857, which was a major step in the final shaping of modern central heating. The Victorian cast iron radiator became widespread by the end of the 19th century as companies, such as the American Radiator Company, expanded the market for low cost radiators in the US and Europe.

== Energy sources ==
The energy source selected for a central heating system varies by region. The primary energy source is selected on the basis of cost, convenience, efficiency and reliability. The energy cost of heating is one of the main costs of operating a building in a cold climate. Some central heating plants can switch fuels for reasons of economy and convenience; for example, a home owner may install a wood-fired furnace with electrical backup for occasional unattended operation.

Solid fuels such as wood, peat or coal can be stockpiled at the point of use, but are inconvenient to handle and difficult to automatically control. Wood fuel is still used where the supply is plentiful and the occupants of the building don't mind the work involved in hauling in fuel, removing ashes, and tending the fire. Pellet fuel systems can automatically stoke the fire, but still need manual removal of ash. Coal was once an important residential heating fuel but today is uncommon, and smokeless fuel is preferred as a substitute in open fireplaces or stoves.

Liquid fuels are petroleum products such as heating oil and kerosene. These are still widely applied where other heat sources are unavailable. Fuel oil can be automatically fired in a central heating system and requires no ash removal and little maintenance of the combustion system. However, the variable price of oil on world markets leads to erratic and high prices compared to some other energy sources. Institutional heating systems (office buildings or schools, for example) can use low-grade, inexpensive bunker fuel to run their heating plants, but capital cost is high compared to more easily managed liquid fuels.

Natural gas is a widespread heating fuel in North America and northern Europe. Gas burners are automatically controlled and require no ash removal and little maintenance. However, not all areas have access to a natural gas distribution system. Liquefied petroleum gas or propane can be stored at the point of use and periodically replenished by a truck-mounted mobile tank.

Some areas have low cost electric power, making electric heating economically practical. Electric heating can either be purely resistance-type heating or make use of a heat pump system to take advantage of low-grade heat in the air or ground.

A district heating system uses centrally located boilers or water heaters and circulates heat energy to individual customers by circulating hot water or steam. This has the advantage of a central highly efficient energy converter that can use the best available pollution controls, and that is professionally operated. The district heating system can use heat sources impractical to deploy to individual homes, such as heavy oil, wood byproducts, or nuclear fission. The distribution network is more costly to build than for gas or electric heating, and so is only found in densely populated areas or compact communities.

Not all central heating systems require purchased energy. A few buildings are served by local geothermal heat, using hot water or steam from a local well to provide building heat. Such areas are uncommon. A passive solar system requires no purchased fuel but needs to be carefully designed for the site.

== Calculating output of heater required ==
Heater outputs are measured in kilowatts or BTUs per hour. For placement in a house, the heater, and the level of output required for the house, needs to be calculated. This calculation is achieved by recording a variety of factors – namely, what is above and below the room you wish to heat, how many windows there are, the type of external walls in the property and a variety of other factors that will determine the level of heat output that is required to adequately heat the space. This calculation is called a heat loss calculation and can be done with a BTU Calculator. Depending on the outcome of this calculation, the heater can be exactly matched to the house.

=== Billing ===
Heat output can be measured by heat cost allocators, so that each unit can be individually billed even though there is only one centralized system.

== Types of central heating ==
=== Water heating ===
Active indirect water heater

Circulating hot water can be used for central heating. Sometimes these systems are called hydronic heating systems.

Common components of a central heating system using water-circulation include:

- A supply of fuel, electric power or district heating supply lines
- A boiler (or a heat exchanger for district heating) which heats water in the system
- Pump to circulate the water
- Radiators through which the heated water passes in order to release heat into rooms.

The circulating water systems use a closed loop; the same water is heated and then reheated. A sealed system provides a form of central heating in which the water used for heating circulates independently of the building's normal water supply.

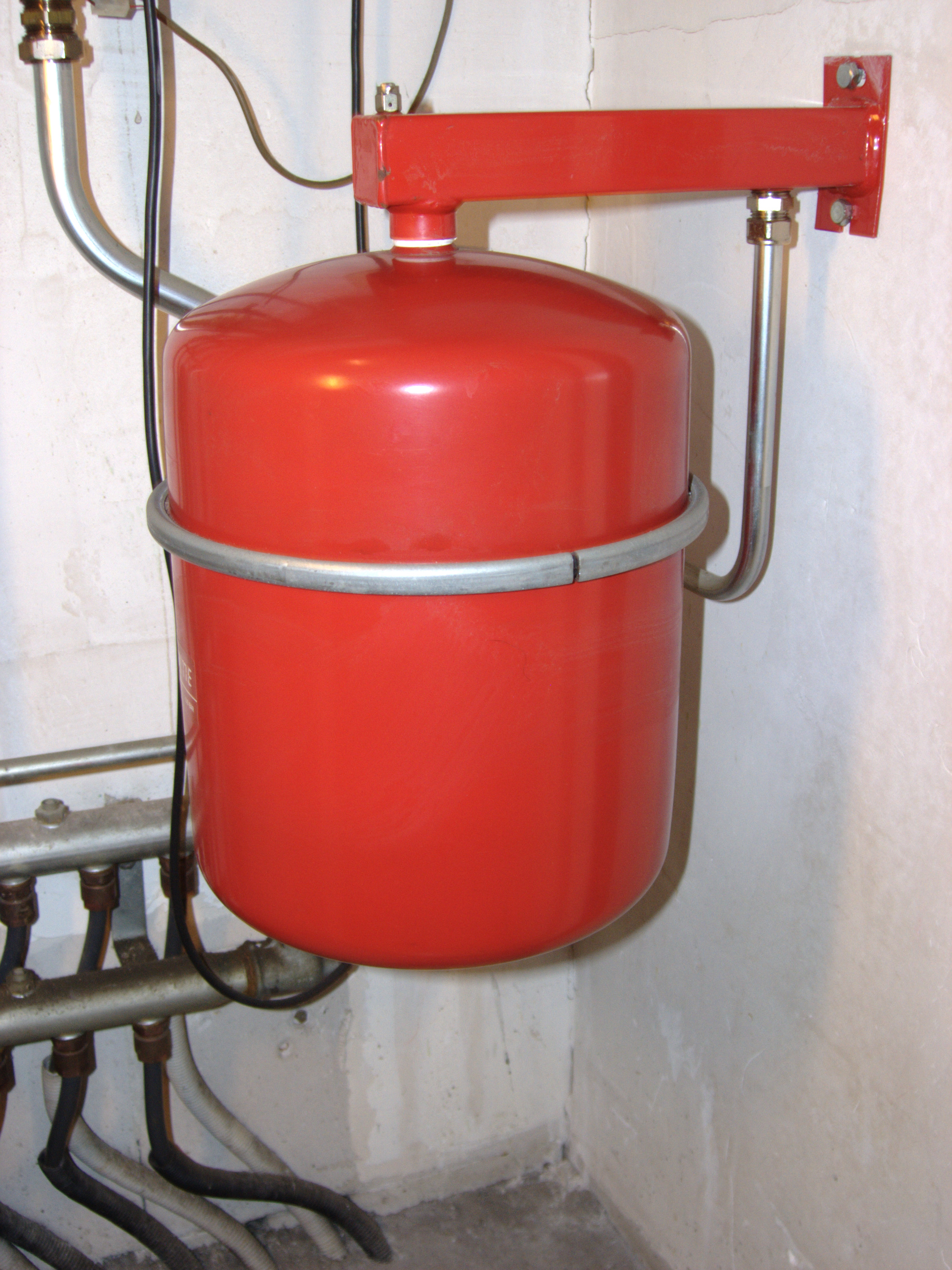
Expansion tank in a sealed system

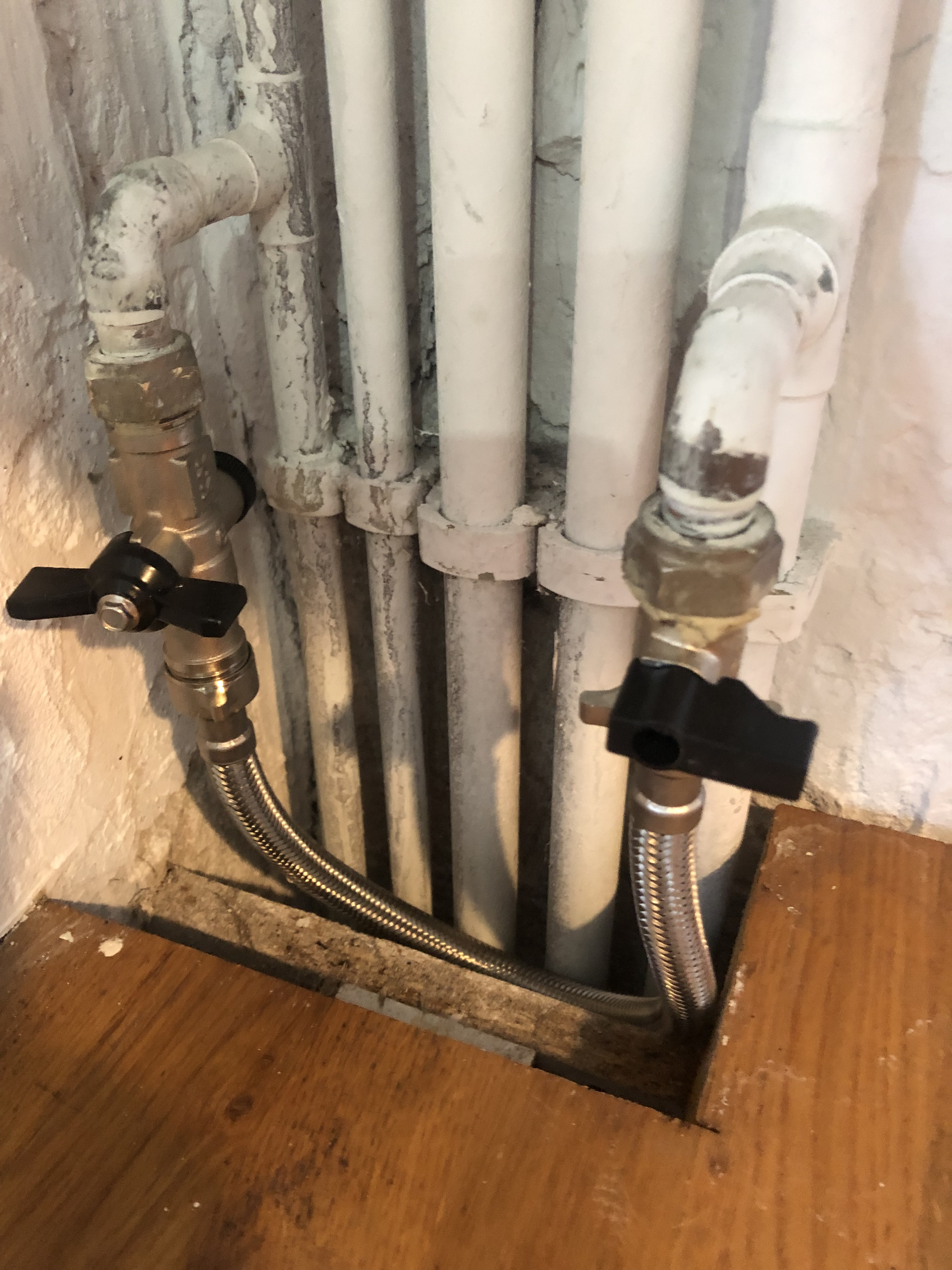
A straight braided filling loop used to add water to a sealed central heating system in the UK

An expansion tank contains compressed gas, separated from the sealed-system water by a diaphragm. This allows for normal variations of pressure in the system. A safety valve allows water to escape from the system when pressure becomes too high, and a valve can open to replenish water from the normal water supply if the pressure drops too low. Sealed systems offer an alternative to open-vent systems, in which steam can escape from the system, and gets replaced from the building's water supply via a feed and central storage system.

Heating systems in the United Kingdom and in other parts of Europe commonly combine the needs of space heating with domestic hot-water heating. These systems occur less commonly in the USA. In this case, the heated water in a sealed system flows through a heat exchanger in a hot-water tank or hot-water cylinder where it heats water from the regular potable water supply for use at hot-water taps or appliances such as washing machines or dishwashers.

Hydronic radiant floor heating systems use a boiler or district heating to heat water and a pump to circulate the hot water in plastic pipes installed in a concrete slab. The pipes, embedded in the floor, carry heated water that conducts warmth to the surface of the floor, where it broadcasts heat energy to the room above. Hydronic heating systems are also used with antifreeze solutions in ice and snow melt systems for walkways, parking lots and streets. They are more commonly used in commercial and whole house radiant floor heat projects, whereas electric radiant heat systems are more commonly used in smaller "spot warming" applications.

=== Steam heating ===
A steam heating system takes advantage of the high latent heat which is given off when steam condenses to liquid. In a steam heating system, each room is equipped with a radiator which is connected to a source of low-pressure steam (a boiler). Steam entering the radiator condenses and gives up its latent heat, returning to liquid. The radiator in turn heats the air of the room and provides some direct radiant heat. The condensate water returns to the boiler either by gravity or with the assistance of a pump. Some systems use only a single pipe for combined steam and condensate return. Since trapped air prevents proper circulation, such systems have vent valves to allow air to be purged. In domestic and small commercial buildings, the steam is generated at relatively low gauge pressure, less than 15 psi (100 kPa).

Steam heating systems are rarely installed in new single-family residential construction owing to the cost of the piping installation. Pipes must be carefully sloped to prevent trapped condensate blockage. Compared to other methods of heating, it is more difficult to control the output of a steam system. However, steam can be sent, for example, between buildings on a campus to allow use of an efficient central boiler and low-cost fuel. Tall buildings take advantage of the low density of steam to avoid the excessive pressure required to circulate hot water from a basement-mounted boiler. In industrial systems, process steam used for power generation or other purposes can also be tapped for space heating. Steam for heating systems may also be obtained from heat-recovery boilers using heat from industrial processes that would otherwise be wasted.

=== Electric heating ===
Electric heating or resistance heating converts electricity directly to heat. Electric heat is often more expensive than heat produced by combustion appliances like natural gas, propane, and oil. Electric resistance heat can be provided by baseboard heaters, space heaters, radiant heaters, furnaces, wall heaters, or thermal storage systems.

Electric heaters are usually part of a fan coil which is part of a central air conditioner. They circulate heat by blowing air across the heating element which is supplied to the furnace through return air ducts. Blowers in electric furnaces move air over one to five resistance coils or elements which are usually rated at five kilowatts. The heating elements activate one at a time to avoid overloading the electrical system. Overheating is prevented by a safety switch called a limit controller or limit switch. This limit controller may shut the furnace off if the blower fails or if something is blocking the air flow. The heated air is then sent back through the home through supply ducts.

In larger commercial applications, central heating is provided through an air handler which incorporates similar components as a furnace but on a larger scale.

A data furnace uses computers to convert electricity into heat while simultaneously processing data.

=== Heat pumps ===
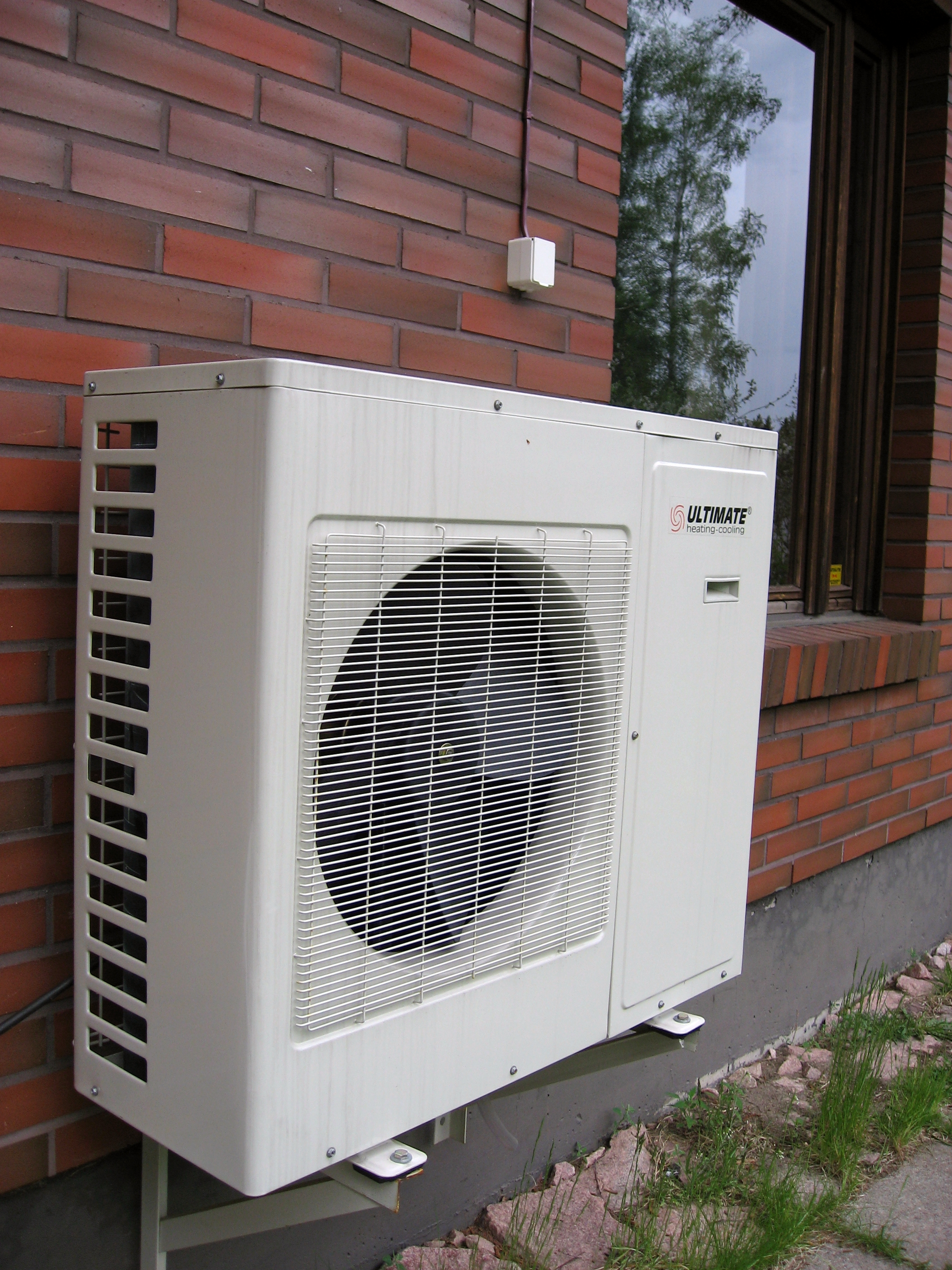
External heat exchanger of an air source heat pump

An air source heat pump can be used to air condition the building during hot weather, and to warm the building using heat extracted from outdoor air in cold weather. In colder climates, geothermal heat pumps can be used to extract heat from the ground. For economy, these systems are designed for average low winter temperatures and use supplemental heating for extreme low temperature conditions. The advantage of the heat pump is that it reduces the purchased energy required for building heating; often geothermal source systems also supply domestic hot water. Even in places where fossil fuels provide most electricity, a geothermal system may offset greenhouse gas production since most of the heat is supplied from the surrounding environment, with only 15–30% as electrical consumption.

== Environmental aspects ==
Public and commercial properties are directly and indirectly responsible for 30% of the final energy consumed around the world, including almost 55% of global electricity consumption. Heating is currently responsible for around 45% of building emissions, and still relying on fossil fuels for supplying more than 55% of its final energy consumption.

Around 4.3 Gt of CO_{2} were released to the atmosphere in 2019 for heating in buildings when accounting for emissions from direct fossil fuel combustion as well as from upstream electricity and heat generation. This represents nearly 12% of global energy and process-related CO_{2} emissions.

From an energy-efficiency standpoint considerable heat gets lost or goes to waste if only a single room needs heating, since central heating has distribution losses and (in the case of forced-air systems particularly) may heat some unoccupied rooms without need. In such buildings which require isolated heating, one may wish to consider non-central systems such as individual room heaters, fireplaces or other devices. Alternatively, architects can design new buildings which can virtually eliminate the need for heating, such as those built to the Passive House standard.

However, if a building does need full heating, combustion central heating may offer a more environmentally friendly solution than electric resistance heating. This applies when electricity originates from a fossil fuel power station, with up to 60% of the energy in the fuel lost (unless utilized for district heating) and about 6% in transmission losses. In Sweden proposals exist to phase out direct electric heating for this reason (see oil phase-out in Sweden). Nuclear, wind, solar and hydroelectric sources reduce this factor.

In contrast, hot-water central heating systems can use water heated in or close to the building using high-efficiency condensing boilers, biofuels, or district heating. Wet underfloor heating has proven ideal. This offers the option of relatively easy conversion in the future to use developing technologies such as heat pumps and solar combisystems, thereby also providing future-proofing.

Typical efficiencies for central heating (measured at the customer's purchase of energy) are:

- 65–97% for gas-fired heating;
- 80–89% for oil-fired and
- 45–60% for coal-fired heating.

Oil storage tanks, especially underground storage tanks, can also impact the environment. Even if a building's heating system was converted from oil long ago, oil may still be impacting the environment by contaminating soil and groundwater. Building owners can find themselves liable to remove buried tanks and the remediation costs.

== See also ==
- District heating
- Energy conservation
- Forced air
- Forced-air gas
- Geothermal systems
- Hearth
- Hydronics
- Oil heater
- OpenTherm
- Renewable energy
- Solar combisystem
- Thermostat
- Underfloor heating
- Water heating
- Wind energy
- Outdoor wood heaters
- Uniform Mechanical Code
- Passive house

== Sources ==
- Hägermann, Dieter; Schneider, Helmuth (1997). Propyläen Technikgeschichte. Landbau und Handwerk, 750 v. Chr. bis 1000 n. Chr (2nd ed.). Berlin. ISBN 3-549-05632-X.
