= Thomas Tredgold =

English engineer and author

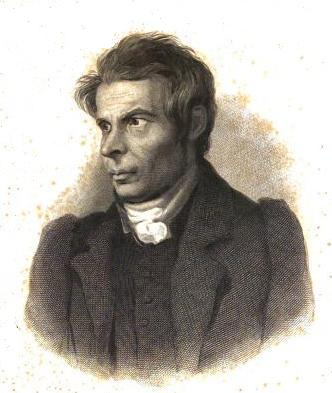
Thomas Tredgold.

Thomas Tredgold (22 August 1788 – 28 January 1829) was an English engineer and author, known for his early work on railroad construction. His definition of civil engineering formed the basis of the charter of the Institution of Civil Engineers.

== Biography ==
He was born at Brandon, County Durham, on 22 August 1788. After some elementary education at the village school, he was apprenticed at 14 to a cabinet-maker in Durham. He remained with him six years, studying also mathematics, architecture, and perspective. In 1808, after his apprenticeship had expired, he went to Scotland, where he worked for five years as a joiner and journeyman carpenter.

Later Tredgold went to London, where he entered the office of his uncle William Atkinson the architect, with whom he lived for six years, and whom he served for longer. He read on architecture and engineering; and taught himself French.

In 1823, the demands of his writing led Tredgold to resign his position in Atkinson's office. He died on 28 January 1829, and was buried in St. John's Wood chapel cemetery.

=== Family ===
Tredgold left a widow, three daughters, and a son Thomas, who held the post of engineer in the office of stamps of the East India Company at Calcutta, where he died on 4 May 1853.

== Works ==
In 1820, Tredgold published Elementary Principles of Carpentry (London), on making floors, roofs, bridges, and other structures. He appended an essay on the nature and properties of timber. Apart from Peter Barlow's Essay on the Strength of Timber and other Materials in 1817, Tredgold's work was the first serious attempt in England to deal practically and scientifically with the data of resistance; before his time engineers relied mainly on the formulæ and results found in Count Buffon and Peter van Musschenbroek's Physicæ Experimentales et Geometricæ (Leyden, 1729); some of Tredgold's results were taken from Gabriel Pierre Martin Dumont's Parallèle de plans des plus belles salles de spectacles d'ltalie et de France (Paris, 1767). Several editions of Tredgold's work were published, one by Edward Wyndham Tarn appearing in 1886 (London). This work was followed in 1822 by A Practical Essay on the Strength of Cast Iron and other Metals (London; 5th edit., by Eaton Hodgkinson, London, 1860–1), which is mainly founded on the work of Thomas Young. Tredgold lacked the mathematics of the theory of elasticity; he was inaccurate, and often obscure.

In 1824, Tredgold published Principles of Warming and Ventilating Public Buildings (London), which reached a second edition in the same year (3rd edit., with appendix by Bramah, 1836). In 1825 appeared A Practical Treatise on Railroads and Carriages (London; 1st edit. London, 1825), which was followed by a pamphlet addressed to William Huskisson as President of the Board of Trade, Remarks on Steam Navigation and its Protection, Regulation, and Encouragement (London, 1825), with suggestions for the prevention of accidents. His last major work, The Steam Engine, appeared in 1827 (London). A new enlarged edition, by Westley Stoker Barker Woolhouse, was published in 1838 (London). James Hann assisted Woodhouse, and a third edition appeared in 1850–3 (London), with contributions in particular by John Seaward and Edward Woods. A French translation was made by François Noël Mellet (1838, Paris).

Tredgold also edited John Smeaton's Hydraulic Tracts (1826; 2nd edit. 1837), added notes and articles to Robertson Buchanan's Practical Essays on millwork (ed. George Rennie, London, 1841), and revised Peter Nicholson's New Practical Builder (London, 1861). He contributed the articles on joinery and stone masonry to the supplement of the Encyclopædia Britannica (ed. 1824), and contributed technical articles to the Philosophical Magazine and to Thomas Thomson's Annals of Philosophy.

== Legacy in civil engineering ==
Tredgold gave an influential definition of civil engineering, on which the charter of the Institution of Civil Engineers based itself in 1828:

A Society for the general advancement of Mechanical Science, and more particularly for promoting the acquisition of that species of knowledge which constitutes the profession of a Civil Engineer; being the art of directing the great sources of power in Nature for the use and convenience of man, as the means of production and of traffic in states, both for external and internal trade, as applied in the construction of roads, bridges, aqueducts, canals, river navigation, and docks, for internal intercourse and exchange; and in the construction of ports harbours, moles, breakwaters, and lighthouses, and in the art of navigation by artificial power, for the purposes of commerce; and in the construction and adaptation of machinery, and in the drainage of cities and towns.
