= Condensing boiler =

Type of water heater

Condensing boilers are water heaters typically used for heating systems that are fueled by gas or oil. When operated in the correct circumstances, a heating system can achieve high efficiency (greater than 90% on the higher heating value) by condensing water vapour found in the exhaust gases in a heat exchanger to preheat the circulating water. This recovers the latent heat of vaporisation, which would otherwise have been wasted. The condensate is sent to a drain. In many countries, the use of condensing boilers is compulsory or encouraged with financial incentives.

For the condensation process to work properly, the return temperature of the circulating water must be around 55 °C (131 °F) or below, so condensing boilers are often run at lower temperatures, around 70 °C (158 °F) or below, which can require larger pipes and radiators than non-condensing boilers. Nevertheless, even partial condensing is more efficient than a conventional non-condensing boiler.

== Operational principle ==
In a conventional boiler, fuel is burned and the hot gases produced pass through a heat exchanger where much of their heat is transferred to water, thus raising the water's temperature.

One of the hot gases produced in the combustion process is water vapour (steam), which arises from burning the hydrogen content of the fuel. A condensing boiler extracts additional heat from the waste gases by condensing this water vapour to liquid water, thus recovering its latent heat of vaporization. A typical increase in efficiency can be as much as 10–12%. While the effectiveness of the condensing process varies depending on the temperature of the water returning to the boiler, it is always at least as efficient as a non-condensing boiler.

The condensate produced is slightly acidic (pH of 3–5), so suitable materials must be used in areas where liquid is present. Aluminium alloys and stainless steel are most commonly used at high temperatures. In low-temperature areas, plastics are most cost effective (e.g., uPVC and polypropylene). The production of condensate also requires the installation of a heat exchanger condensate drainage system. In a typical installation, this is the only difference between a condensing and non-condensing boiler.

To economically manufacture a condensing boiler's heat exchanger (and for the appliance to be manageable at installation), the smallest practical size for its output is preferred. This approach has resulted in heat exchangers with high combustion-side resistance, often requiring the use of a combustion fan to move the products through narrow passageways. This has also had the benefit of providing the energy for the flue system as the expelled combustion gases are usually below 100 °C (212 °F) and, as such, have a density close to that of air, with little buoyancy. The combustion fan helps to pump exhaust gas to the outside.

== Usage ==
Condensing boilers are now largely replacing earlier, conventional designs in powering domestic central heating systems in Europe and, to a lesser degree, in North America. The Netherlands was the first country to adopt them broadly.

== Efficiency ==
Condensing boiler manufacturers claim that up to 98% thermal efficiency can be achieved, compared to 70%–80% with conventional designs (based on the higher heating value of fuels). Typical models offer efficiencies around 90%, which brings most brands of condensing gas boiler into the highest available categories for energy efficiency. In the UK, this is a SEDBUK (Seasonal Efficiency of Domestic Boilers in the UK) Band A efficiency rating, while in North America they typically receive an Eco Logo and/or Energy Star Certification.

Boiler performance is based on the efficiency of heat transfer and highly dependent on boiler size/output and emitter size/output. System design and installation are critical. Matching the radiation to the Btu/Hr output of the boiler and consideration of the emitter/radiator design temperatures determines the overall efficiency of the space and domestic water heating system.

One reason for an efficiency drop is because the design and/or implementation of the heating system gives return water (heat transfer fluid) temperatures at the boiler of over 55 °C (131 °F), which prevents significant condensation in the heat exchanger. Better education of both installers and owners could be expected to raise efficiency towards the reported laboratory values. Natural Resources Canada also suggests ways to make better use of these boilers, such as combining space and water heating systems. Some boilers (e.g. Potterton) can be switched between two flow temperatures such as 63 °C (145 °F) and 84 °C (183 °F), only the former being "fully condensing." However, boilers are normally installed with higher flow temperature by default because a domestic hot water cylinder is generally heated to 60 °C (140 °F), and this takes too long to achieve with a flow temperature only three degrees higher. Nevertheless, even partial condensing is more efficient than a traditional boiler.

Most non-condensing boilers could be forced to condense through simple control changes. Doing so would reduce fuel consumption considerably, but would quickly destroy any mild steel or cast-iron components of a conventional high-temperature boiler due to the corrosive nature of the condensate. For this reason, most condensing boiler heat-exchangers are made from stainless steel or aluminum/silicon alloy. External stainless steel economizers can be retrofitted to non-condensing boilers to allow them to achieve condensing efficiencies. Temperature control valves are used to blend hot supply water into the return to avoid thermal shock or condensation inside of the boiler.

The lower the return temperature to the boiler the more likely it will be in condensing mode. If the return temperature is kept below approximately 55 °C (131 °F), the boiler should still be in condensing mode making low temperature applications such as radiant floors and even old cast iron radiators a good match for the technology.

Most manufacturers of new domestic condensing boilers produce a basic "fit all" control system that results in the boiler running in condensing mode only on initial heat-up, after which the efficiency drops off. This approach should still exceed that of older models (see the following three documents published by the Building Research Establishment: Information Papers 10-88 and 19-94; General Information Leaflet 74; Digest 339. See also Application Manual AM3 1989: Condensing Boilers by Chartered Institution of Building Services Engineers). By way of contrast Weather compensation systems are designed to adjust the system based on inside, outside, boiler inlet, and boiler outlet temperatures.

== Control ==
The control of the domestic condensing boiler is crucial to ensuring that it operates in the most economic and fuel efficient way. The burners are usually controlled by an embedded system with built-in logic to control the output of the burner to match the load and give best performance.

Modern condensing boilers increasingly use digital communication protocols such as OpenTherm and manufacturer-specific bus systems to modulate burner output, pump speed, and flow temperature in response to real-time demand. These control strategies reduce cycling, improve comfort stability, and increase seasonal efficiency compared to traditional on/off thermostatic control.

Almost all have modulating burners. These allow the power to be reduced to match the demand. Boilers have a turndown ratio which is the ratio of the maximum power output to the minimum power output for which combustion can be maintained. If the control system determines that the demand falls below the minimum power output, then the boiler will cycle off until the water temperature has fallen, and then will reignite and heat the water.

== Reliability ==
Condensing boilers are claimed to have a reputation for being less reliable and may also suffer if worked on by installers and plumbers who may not understand their operation. Claims of unreliability have been contradicted by research carried out by the UK-based Building Research Establishment (see Building Research Establishment).

In particular, the problem of 'pluming' arose with early installations of condensing boilers, in which a white plume of condensed vapour (as minuscule droplets) becomes visible at the outlet flue. Although unimportant to boiler operation, visible pluming was an aesthetic issue that caused much opposition to condensing boilers.

A more significant issue is the slight (pH 3-4) acidity of the condensate liquid. Where this is in direct contact with the boiler's heat exchanger, particularly for thin aluminium sheet, it may give rise to more rapid corrosion than for traditional non-condensing boilers. Older boilers may also have used thick cast heat exchangers, rather than sheet, which had slower time constants for their response but were also resistant, by their sheer mass, to any corrosion. The acidity of the condensate means that only some materials may be used: stainless steel and aluminium are suitable, mild steel, copper or cast iron are not. Poor design or construction standards may have made the heat exchangers of some early condensing boilers less long-lived.

Initial testing and annual monitoring of the heat transfer fluid in condensing boilers with aluminium or stainless steel heat exchangers is highly recommended. Maintenance of a slightly alkaline (pH 8 to 9) liquid with anti-corrosion and buffering agents reduces corrosion of the aluminium heat exchanger. Some professionals believe that the condensate produced on the combustion side of the heat exchanger may corrode an aluminium heat exchanger and shorten boiler life. Statistical evidence is not yet available since condensing boilers with aluminium heat exchangers have not been in use long enough.

== Building Research Establishment ==
The Building Research Establishment, which is the UK's major research body for the building industry, produced a leaflet on domestic condensing boilers. According to the Building Research Establishment:

- modern condensing boilers are as reliable as standard boilers
- condensing boilers are no more difficult to service, nor do they require more frequent servicing
- servicing is not expensive; the only (minor) additional task is to check the correct function of the condensate drain
- condensing boilers are not difficult to install
- under all operating conditions, condensing boilers are always more efficient than standard boilers

== Exhaust ==
The condensate expelled from a condensing boiler is acidic, with a pH between 3 and 4. Condensing boilers require a drainpipe for the condensate produced during operation. This consists of a short length of polymer pipe with a vapour trap to prevent exhaust gases from being expelled into the building. The acidic nature of the condensate may be corrosive to cast iron plumbing, waste pipes and concrete floors but poses no health risk to occupants. A neutralizer, typically consisting of a plastic container filled with marble or limestone aggregate or "chips" (alkaline) can be installed to raise the pH to acceptable levels. If a gravity drain is not available, then a small condensate pump must also be installed to lift it to a proper drain.

In cold climates, external condensate pipework is vulnerable to freezing during prolonged sub-zero temperatures. A frozen condensate drain can cause boiler lockout and prevent safe operation. Mitigation measures include increasing pipe diameter, insulating external pipework, minimizing external discharge length, and routing condensate internally where possible. Some modern boilers incorporate frost protection logic to reduce the risk of condensate freezing.

The primary and secondary heat exchangers are constructed of materials that will withstand this acidity, typically aluminum or stainless steel. Since the final exhaust from a condensing boiler has a lower temperature than the exhaust from an atmospheric boiler 38 °C (100 °F) vs. 204 °C (400 °F) a mechanical fan is always required to expel it, with the additional benefit of allowing the use of low-temperature exhaust piping (typically PVC in domestic applications) without insulation or conventional chimney requirements. Indeed, the use of conventional masonry chimney, or metal flue is specifically prohibited due to the corrosive nature of the flue products, with the notable exception of specially rated stainless steel and aluminum in certain models. The preferred/common vent material for most condensing boilers available in North America is PVC, followed by ABS and CPVC. Polymer venting allows for the added benefit of flexibility of installation location including sidewall venting saving unnecessary penetrations of the roof.

== Cost ==
Condensing boilers are up to 50% more expensive to buy and install than conventional types in the UK and the US. However, as of 2006, at UK prices the extra cost of installing a condensing instead of conventional boiler should be recovered in around two to five years through lower fuel use (for verification, see the following three documents published by the Building Research Establishment: Information Papers 10-88 and 19-94; General Information Leaflet 74; Digest 339; see also Case studies in Application Manual AM3 1989: Condensing Boilers by Chartered Institution of Building Services Engineers), and two to five years at US prices. Exact figures will depend on the efficiency of the original boiler installation, boiler utilisation patterns, the costs associated with the new boiler installation, and how frequently the system is used.

The cost of these boilers is dropping as the mass takeup enforced by government takes effect and the manufacturers withdraw older, less efficient models, but production cost is higher than older types as condensing boilers are more complex.

The increased complexity of condensing boilers is as follows:

- Increased size of heat exchanger, or the addition of a second heat exchanger (It is important that the heat exchangers are designed to be resistant to acid attack from the "wet" flue gases.)
- The necessity of a fan-assisted flue due to the cooler flue gases having less buoyancy, though many non-condensing boilers also have this feature
- The need to drain the condensate produced

With respect to modern boilers, there are no other differences between condensing and non-condensing boilers.

Reliability, as well as initial cost and efficiency, affects total cost of ownership. One major independent UK firm of plumbers stated in 2005 that it had made thousands of call-outs to mend condensing boilers, and that the greenhouse gas emissions from its vans were probably greater than the savings made by the shift to eco-conscious boilers. However, the same article points out that the Heating and Hotwater Information Council, together with some installers, have found that modern condensing boilers are just as reliable as standard boilers.

== Phase-out ==
The phase-out of fossil fuel boilers is a set of policies to remove the use of fossil gas (or "natural gas") and other fossil fuels from the heating of buildings and use in appliances. Typically gas is used to heat water, for showering, or central heating. In many countries, gas heating is one of the major contributors to greenhouse gas emissions and climate damage, leading a growing number of countries to introduce bans. Air source heat pumps are the main alternative.

The International Energy Agency has said that new gas boilers (or gas furnaces) should be banned no later than 2025. Many installations and appliances have a life-span of 25 years, leading for calls that the bans must take place immediately, or at latest by 2025, because otherwise targets of net zero by 2050 cannot or are unlikely to be reached. However fossil fuels lobbyists are resisting phase-out.

== Gallery ==
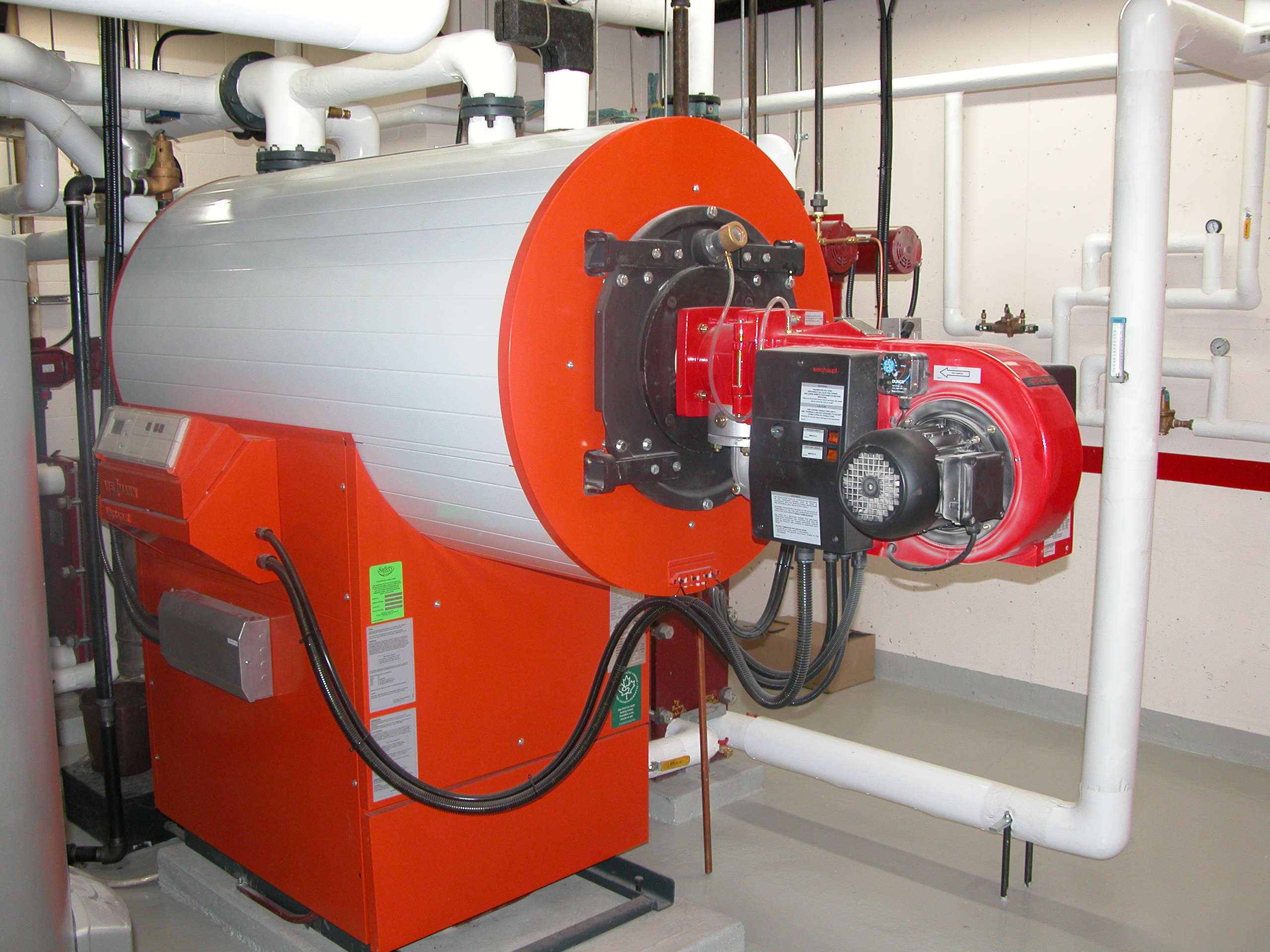
Condensing boiler

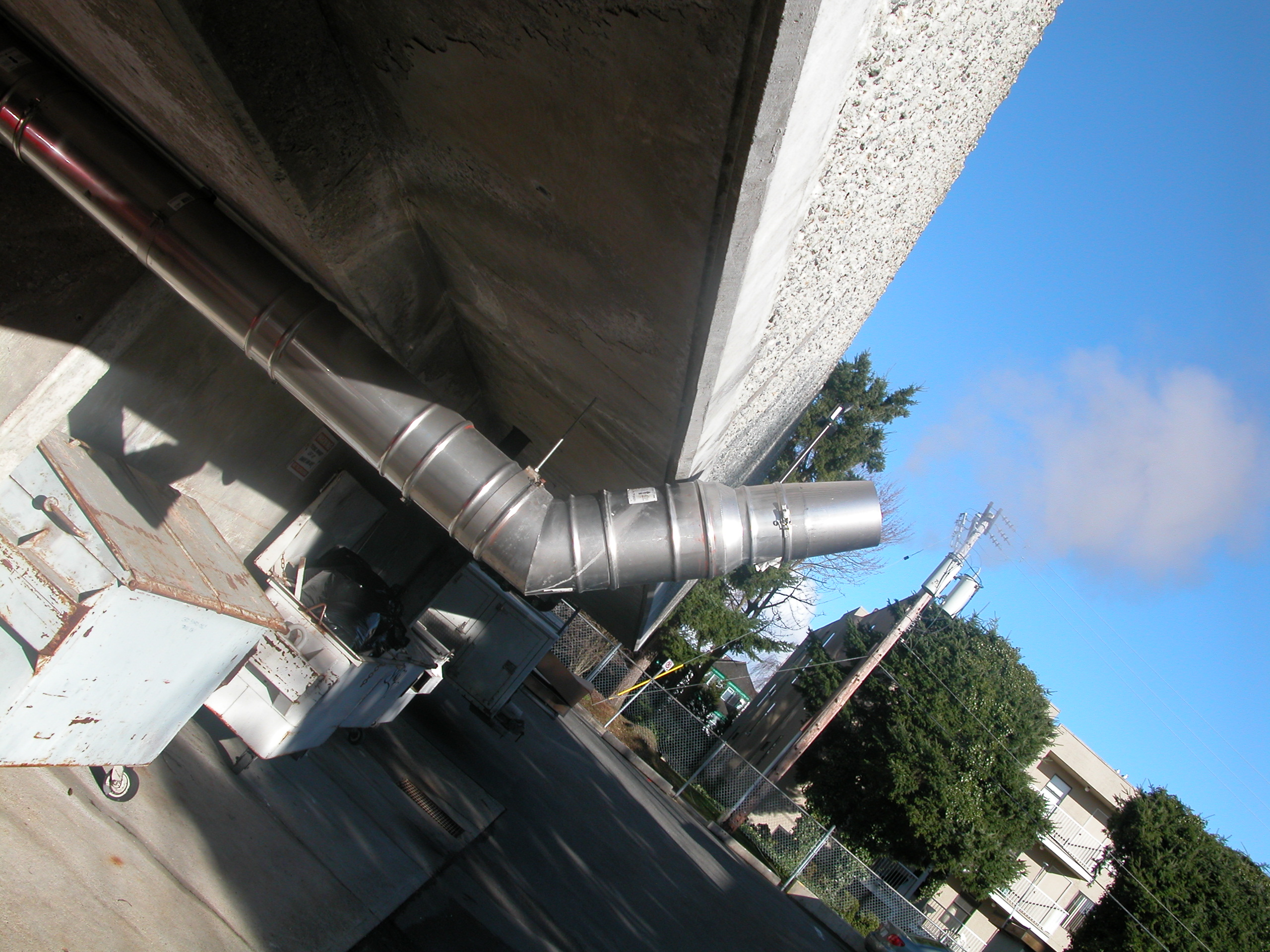
Condensing boiler exhaust

Condensing boiler

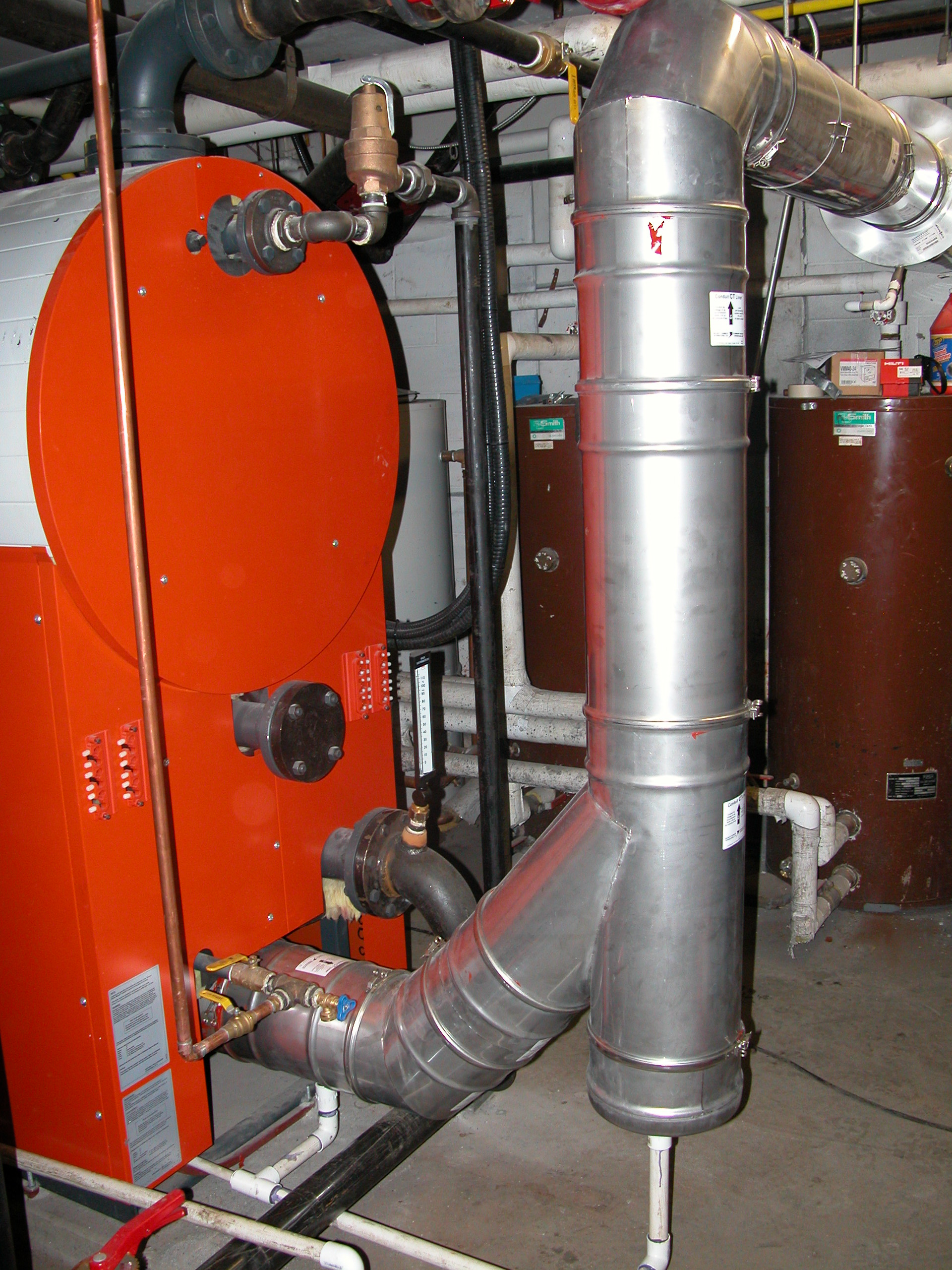
Stainless steel exhaust with condensate

== See also ==
- Energy efficiency in British housing
- Flue-gas condensation – Process for heat recovery
- OpenTherm – Communications protocol for central heating systems
