= Centrolinead =

Drawing tools for perspective drawings

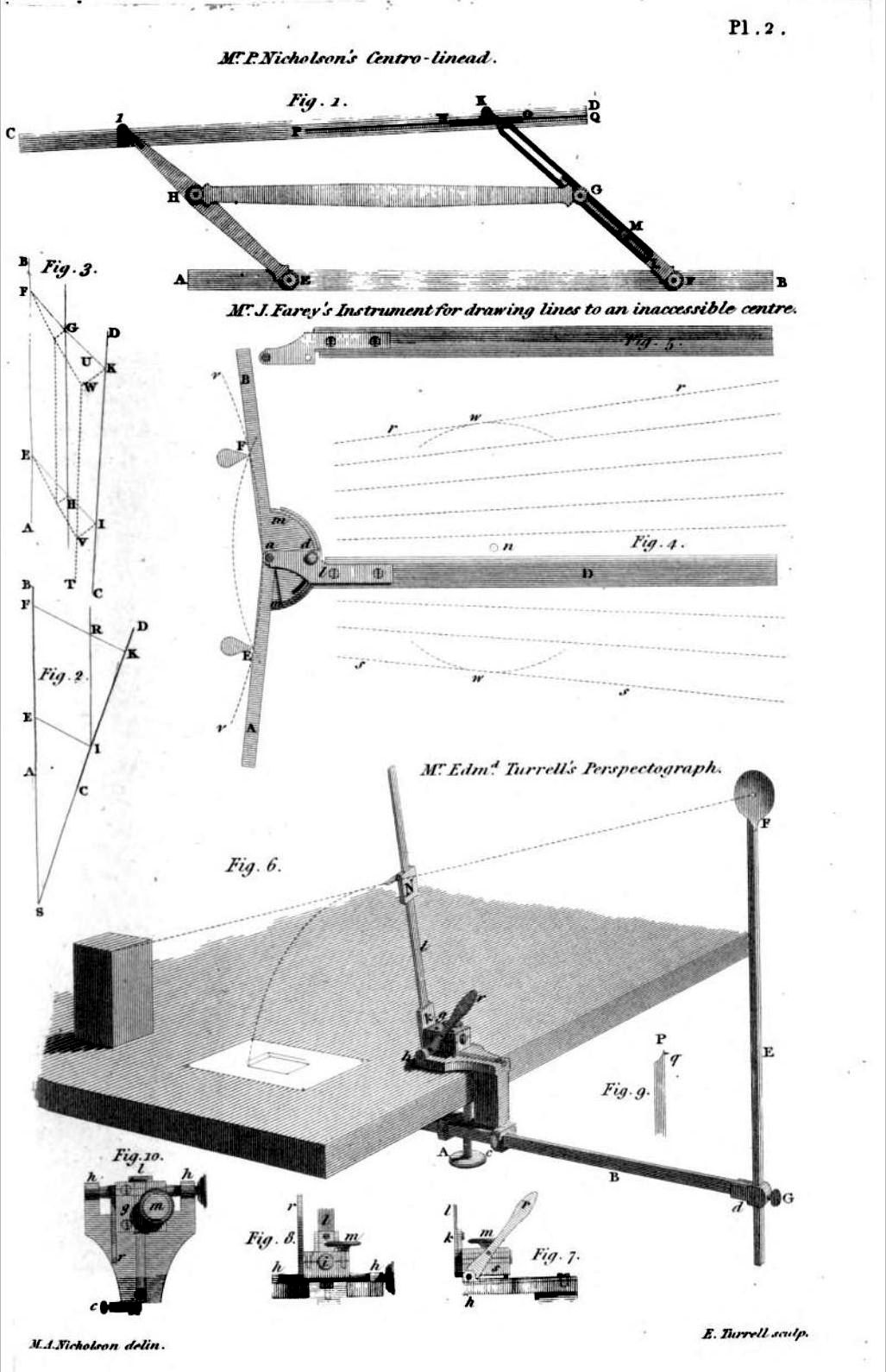
Two sorts of centrolinead are shown (top and middle).

Centrolineads are technical drawing tools used to create perspective drawings where one or more of the vanishing points lie outside of the drawing board. Two forms of centrolinead were invented independently by Britons Peter Nicholson and John Farey Jr. in the early 1800s, for which they were both recognised by the Society for the Encouragement of Arts, Manufactures and Commerce in 1814 with twenty guineas and the society's Silver Medal, respectively.

== Usage ==
Nicholson's centrolinead is a modification of a pair of parallel rulers. The bar farthest from the vanishing point can be lengthened, being composed of a fixed piece and a sliding piece pinned together. The fixed piece forms an ordinary parallel ruler, with the sliding piece extended out to form a ruler at an angle. The link to this ruler can also slide, allowing the angle of the ruler to shift so that it always intersects the vanishing point.

To use Nicholson's centrolinead, two lines converging at the vanishing point must already be drawn.

Farey's centrolinead uses two hinged support arms and a drawing arm. The drawing arm is positioned so that its drawing edge lines up with the corner formed by the two support arms. Two pins are placed so that the line between them is bisected perpendicularly by a line from the vanishing point. With the support arms at a fixed angle, and held at various positions against the pins, the drawing arm produces lines that converge at the vanishing point.

Simplified versions of Farey's centrolinead were developed later, with the arms formed from a single piece of wood.

Additional pairs of lines or pins can be used to produce multiple vanishing points.

== Gallery ==
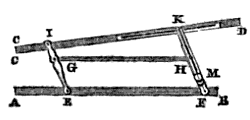
Nicholson's centrolinead with illustrations.

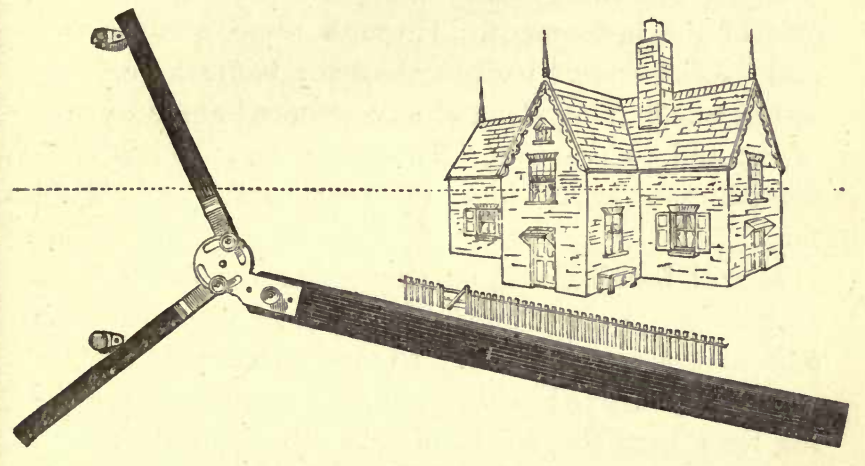
A centrolinead of Farey's type with a house drawn in two-point perspective.

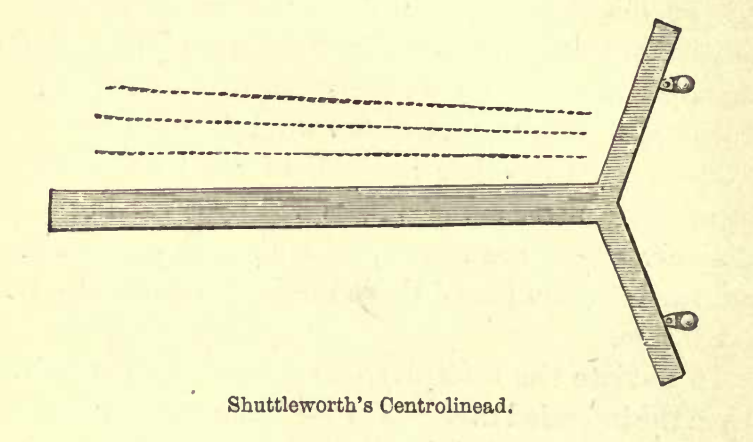
A simplified variant of Farey's centrolinead, with the three arms formed out of a single piece of wood.
