= Cyclograph =

Instrument for drawing arcs of large diameter with no clear center

A cyclograph (also known as an arcograph) is an instrument for drawing arcs of large diameter circles whose centres are inconveniently or inaccessibly located, one version of which was invented by Scottish architect and mathematician Peter Nicholson.

== Description ==
In his autobiography, published in 1904, polymath Herbert Spencer eloquently describes his own near re-invention of Nicholson's cyclograph while working as a civil engineer for the Birmingham and Gloucester Railway.

During the latter part of 1839 the preparations of plans for crossings and sidings at various stations was put into my hands. A device for saving trouble was one of the consequences. Curves of very large radius had to be drawn; and, finding a beam-compass of adequate length difficult to manage, I bethought me of an instrumental application of the geometrical truth that angles in the same segment of a circle are equal to one another. An obvious implication is that if an angle be made rigid, and its arms be obliged to move through the two points terminating the segment, the apex of the angle must describe a circle. In pursuance of this idea I had made an instrument hinged like a foot-rule, but capable of having its hinge screwed tight in any position, and carrying a pen or pencil. Two needles thrust into the paper at the desired points, being pressed against by the arms of the instrument, as it was moved from side to side, its pen or pencil described the arc of a circle. When about to publish a description of this appliance, I discovered that it had been already devised, and was known as Nicholson’s Cyclograph.

— Herbert Spencer, An Autobiography

== See also ==
- Spirograph
