= Forced-air =

HVAC system

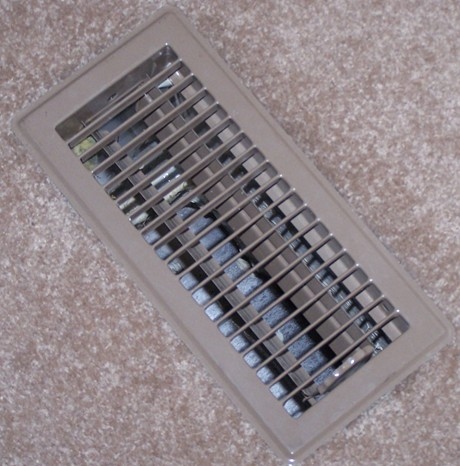
A forced-air system includes registers located in individual rooms through which heated air is discharged.

A forced-air central heating system is one which uses air as its heat transfer medium. These systems rely on ductwork, vents, and plenums as means of air distribution, separate from the actual heating and air conditioning systems. The return plenum carries the air from several large return grills (vents) to a central air handler for re-heating. The supply plenum directs air from the central unit to the rooms which the system is designed to heat. Regardless of type, all air handlers consist of an air filter, blower, heat exchanger/element/coil, and various controls. Like any other kind of central heating system, thermostats are used to control forced air heating systems.

Forced air heating is the type of central heating most commonly installed in North America. It is much less common in Europe, where hydronic heating predominates, especially in the form of hot-water radiators.

== Types ==
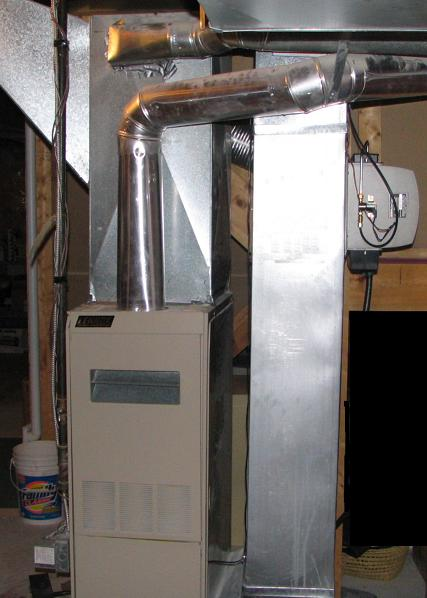
A modern forced-air heating furnace of the gas-fired variety

=== Natural gas/propane/oil/coal/wood ===
- Heat is produced via combustion of fuel.
- A heat exchanger keeps the combustion byproducts from entering the air stream.
- A ribbon style (long with holes), inshot (torch-like), or oil type burner is located in the heat exchanger.
- Ignition is provided by an electric spark, standing pilot, or hot surface igniter.
- Safety devices ensure that combustion gases and/or unburned fuel do not accumulate in the event of an ignition failure or venting failure.

=== Electric ===
- A simple electric heating element warms the air.
- When the thermostat calls for heat, blower and element come on at the same time.
- When thermostat is "satisfied", blower and element shut off.
- Requires very little maintenance.
- Usually more expensive to operate than a natural gas furnace.

=== Heat pump ===
- Extracts heat from the environment, using either the ground or air as the source, via the refrigeration cycle.
- Requires less energy than electric resistance heating and possibly more efficient than fossil fuel fired furnaces (gas/oil/coal).
- Air source types may not be suitable for cold climates unless used with backup (secondary) source of heat. Newer models may still provide heat when coping with temperatures below 0 °C (32 °F).
- A refrigerant coil is located in the air handler instead of a burner/heat exchanger. The system can also be used for cooling, just as any central air-conditioning system.

=== Hydronic coil ===
- Combines hydronic (hot water) heating with a forced air delivery
- Heat is produced via combustion of fuel (gas/propane/oil) in a boiler
- A heat exchanger (hydronic coil) is placed in the air handler similar to the refrigerant coil in a heat pump or central air conditioning system. Copper is often specified in supply and return manifolds and in tube coils.
- Heated water is pumped through the heat exchanger then back to the boiler to be reheated

==== Sequence of operation ====
1. Thermostat calls for heat
2. Source of ignition is provided at the boiler
3. Circulator initiates water flow to the hydronic coil (heat exchanger)
4. Once the heat exchanger warms up, the main blower is activated
5. When call for heat ceases, the boiler and circulator turn off
6. Blower shuts off after period of time (depending on the particular equipment involved this may be a fixed or programmable amount of time)

== Self-balancing mechanism ==
The basis of any CAV regulator is the self-balancing mechanism. It is the design of this mechanism that determines the accuracy of maintaining the set flow rate, noise level, minimum regulator resistance, flow range and other parameters.

There are different designs of the self-balancing mechanism that largely determine the technical characteristics of CAV regulators:

- Self-balancing mechanism based on a silicone adjustment diaphragm that changes its volume depending on the air pressure in the duct, thereby increasing or decreasing the air flow area.
- Self-balancing mechanism with overlapping section. The self-balancing damper with spring automatically closes the remaining part of the cross-section depending on the duct pressures.
- Self-balancing mechanism with connector for flow adjustment.

Typically, the regulator damper is made of lightweight aluminum, and the self-balancing mechanism consists of plastic levers and transmission, a steel spring and silicone vibration dampers, which are necessary to prevent auto-oscillation.

== CAV and VAV ==
An alternative to a constant air volume system is a variable air volume (VAV) system. Variable air volume systems are generally more complex than their CAV counterparts because they must utilize temperature control and control the actual volume of air blown into each room. Although more difficult to design and implement, a VAV system is more energy efficient than a CAV system because the components of a variable airflow design operate only as needed.

== Advantages and disadvantages ==
Compared to water, air masses have a lower heat capacity. This means that they cool down faster, but they also raise the room temperature in a short time. Low thermal inertia allows literally in a few minutes to heat different in volume buildings. At the same time, all the heat goes only to heat the rooms.

=== Systems with air-heating units ===
Disadvantages: high noise level, disperse dust, each unit requires a supply of heat transfer fluid and electricity, have a high gradient of air temperature over height.

Advantages: does not require large cross-sectional ducts, has a long spray range

=== Air heating systems combined with supply ventilation ===
Disadvantages: require ducts with large cross-sections, it is necessary to reserve the supply unit and pump in the piping assembly, have a high gradient of air temperature over the height, have a small range of the jet.

Advantages: presentable from a design point of view (only the grilles are visible), inexpensive (considering the combination with the ventilation system).

== See also ==
- Forced-air gas
- Copper in heat exchangers
