= Peter Nicholson (architect) =

Scottish architect (1765–1844)

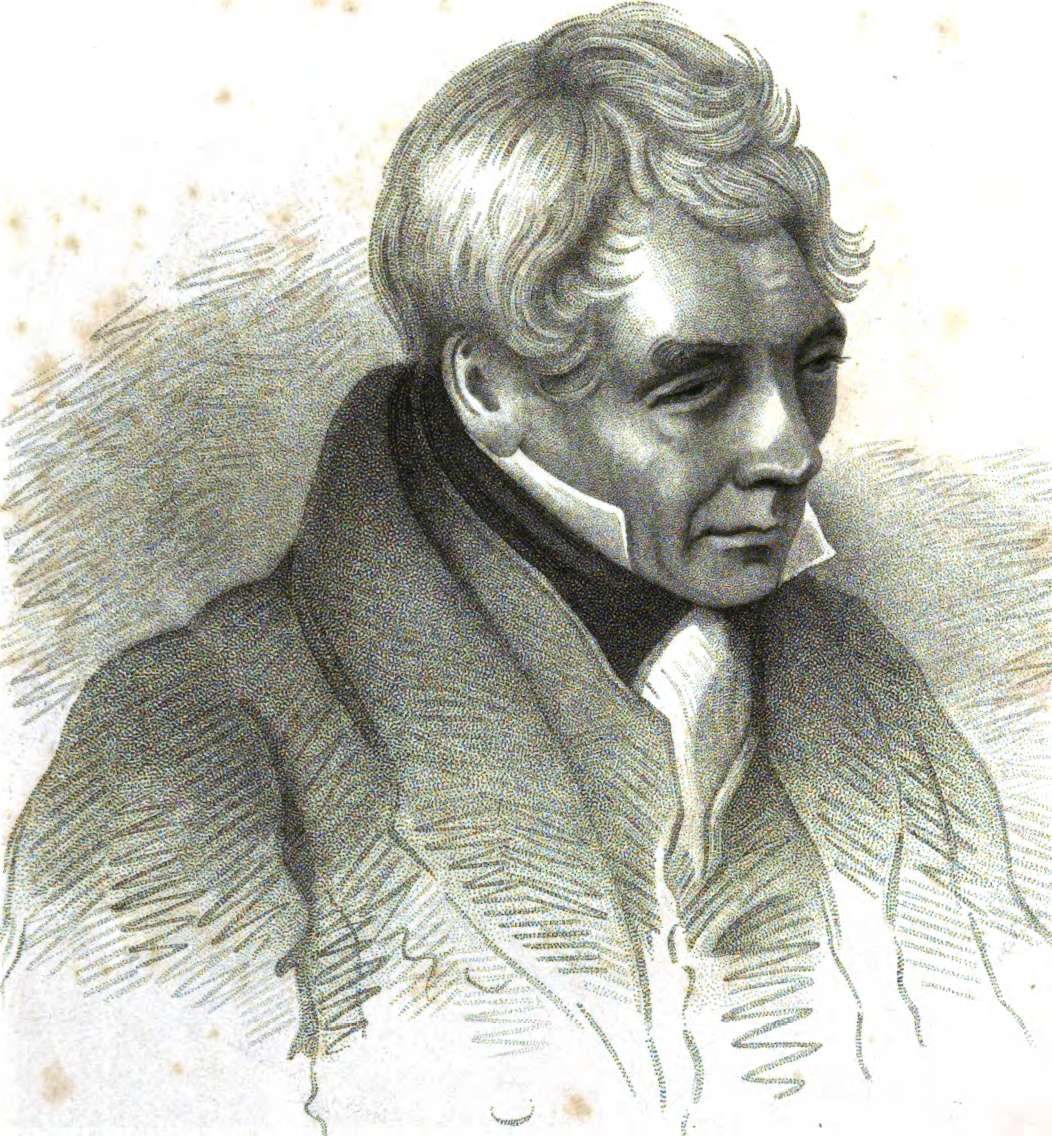
- Engraved portrait of Nicholson from the frontispiece of his Guide to Railway Masonry
- Born: 20 July 1765; Prestonkirk, East Lothian
- Died: 18 June 1844 (aged 78); Carlisle, Cumbria
- Education: Parish school (three years only), mostly self-taught
- Spouse(s): Jane (d. 1832); re-married
- Children: Michael Angelo Nicholson (c. 1796–1841), by Jane; Jessie Nicholson (m. Bowen), Jamieson T. Nicholson, both by 2nd wife
- Parent: [father was a stonemason]
- Engineering career
- Discipline: Architect, mathematician, structural engineer
- Projects: Carlton Place, Glasgow; Ardrossan town plan
- Significant design: The centrolinead The cyclograph
- Significant advance: The helicoidal skew arch

Peter Nicholson (20 July 1765 – 18 June 1844) was a Scottish architect, mathematician and engineer. Largely self-taught, he was apprenticed to a cabinet-maker but soon abandoned his trade in favour of teaching and writing. He practised as an architect but is best remembered for his theoretical work on the skew arch (he never actually constructed one himself), his invention of draughtsman's instruments, including a centrolinead and a cyclograph, and his prolific writing on numerous practical subjects.

== Biography ==
=== Early life ===
Born in 1765 in the parish of Prestonkirk, East Lothian, Peter Nicholson was the son of a stonemason. Largely self-taught and excelling in the field of mathematics, he received only a rudimentary formal education, studying under a Mr Richardson, brother of architect George Richardson, at the local parish school from the age of nine until he left, aged 12, to assist his father in the family business. During this time he amused himself by making drawings and models of the numerous mills in the neighbourhood. However, finding stonemasonry not to his liking, he expressed the desire to be a cabinet-maker and so served a four-year apprenticeship at Linton, the principal village in the parish, then worked as a journeyman in Edinburgh before leaving for London in 1789 at the age of 24.

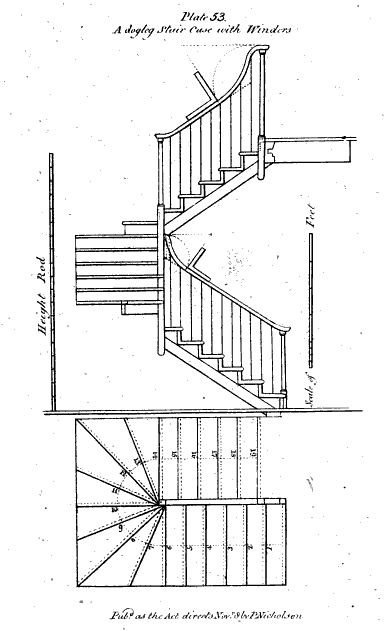
A plate from Nicholson's first book The Carpenter's New Guide, engraved by his own hand

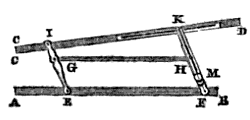
Nicholson's centrolinead

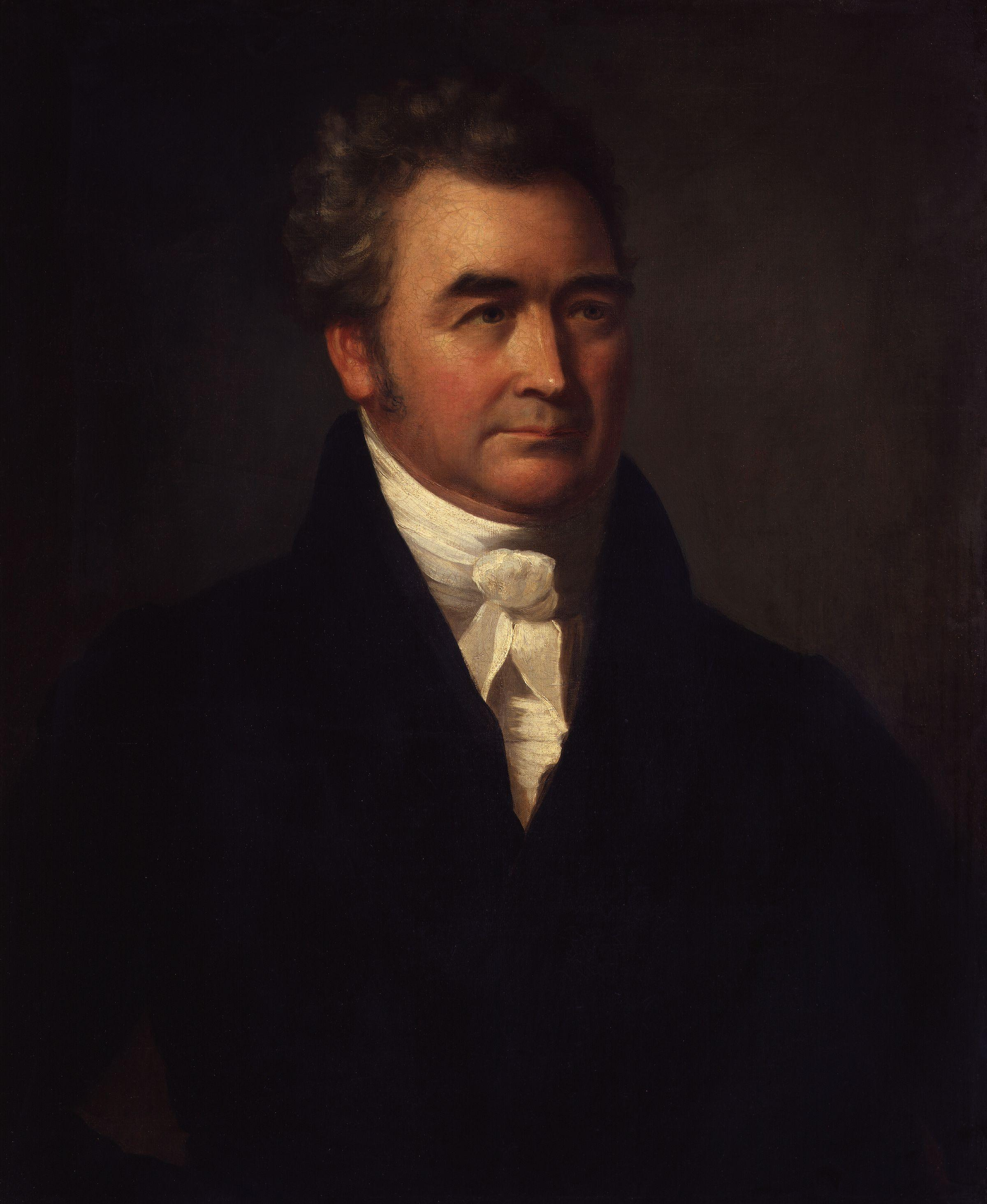
Portrait of Nicholson by James Green, c. 1816, donated to the National Portrait Gallery in 1961

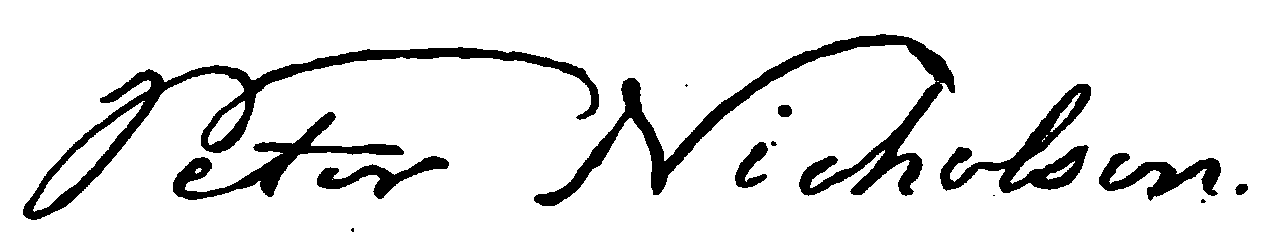
Nicholson's signature

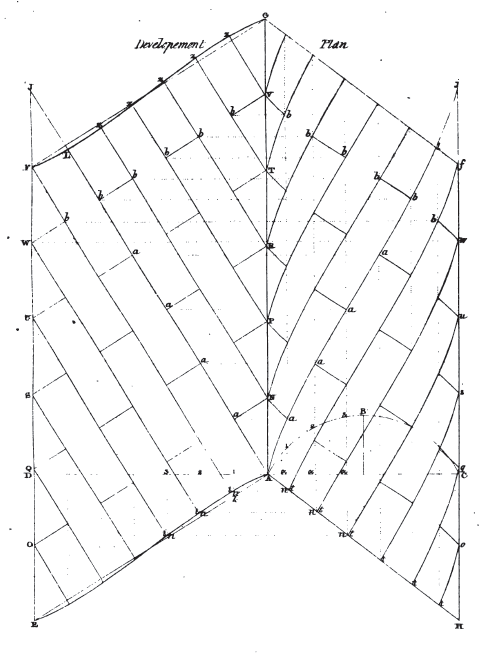
A plate from Nicholson's Guide to Railway Masonry showing the development (left) and the plan view of the intrados of a helicoidal skew arch

Living in London, Nicholson continued trading as a cabinet-maker but also began teaching practical geometry at an evening school for mechanical engineers in Berwick Street, Soho, at which he became so successful that he soon abandoned his trade and took up authorship. He published his first book, The Carpenter's New Guide in 1792, illustrating it with plates engraved by his own hand. It is notable for containing an original method for the construction of groins and niches of complex, double curved forms. Whilst living in London, Nicholson published three more books, The Student's Instructor (1795), The Carpenter and Joiner's Assistant (1797), and a three-volume work entitled Principles of Architecture, which he began in 1794 but did not complete until 1798.

=== Middle years ===
After living in London for 11 years, Nicholson returned to Scotland in 1800, at the age of 35, and spent the next eight years working as an architect in Glasgow, a city already rising to eminence, and to which he made a number of contributions, including a wooden bridge over the River Clyde, Carlton Place in Laurieston, and additions to the college buildings. During this time Hugh Montgomerie, the 12th Earl of Eglinton commissioned him to prepare plans for the new town of Ardrossan in Ayrshire and for the next 50 years his simple but effective grid plan was adhered to. The town's harbour was built under the direction of fellow Scot and celebrated engineer, Thomas Telford who was sufficiently impressed by Nicholson's work that he recommended him for the post of Surveyor to the county of Cumberland, on the death of the incumbent, John Chisholme in 1808.

Successfully securing the post, Nicholson relocated to Carlisle, where he supervised the construction of the new Courts of Justice to Telford's designs and received rewards from the Society for the Encouragement of the Useful Arts for improvements he made to the construction of handrailing and for his invention of a draughtsman's instrument called the centrolinead, before returning to London two years later, in order to resume his teaching and writing.

Establishing a school in Oxford Street, Nicholson taught mathematics, architecture, surveying and building technology, and he continued to develop the centrolinead, in recognition of which he received the Gold Isis Medal and the sum of 20 shillings from the Society for the Encouragement of the Useful Arts in 1814, and a silver medal in 1815. In c. 1816, he sat for portrait artist James Green, the painting being donated to the National Portrait Gallery in London in 1961. The period between 1810 and 1829, during which Nicholson lived in London, was his most prolific as an author. During this time he published Mechanical Exercises (1812), The Builder and Workman's New Director (1822), and The Architectural Dictionary, in two volumes (1812 and 1819). This work was considered the most important of the numerous works that were to make his reputation as a national authority on building technology at a time when the building industry was changing rapidly under the influence of scientific research. In addition to practical books relating to building and architecture, Nicholson also wrote about purely scientific, and sometimes rather esoteric subjects. His Treatise on Practical Perspective (1815) included a discussion and full instructions on the use of the centrolinead, while his mathematical works included such titles as An Introduction to the Method of Increments (1817), Essays on the Combinatorial Analysis (1818), and The Rudiments of Algebra (1819). His Essay on Involution and Evolution (1820) earned him the commendation of the Académie des Sciences in Paris. In 1826, at the age of 61, Nicholson visited France and, by the time of his return, had gained sufficient familiarity with the language to be able to translate books on various mathematical subjects. The following year, he began work on an ambitious project entitled The School of Architecture and Engineering, intending to complete it in 12 affordable volumes, costing just 1s 6d each, but he was forced to abandon the work when the publisher, J. and C. Adlard of London was declared bankrupt and only five volumes were ever produced, this being the only project he left unfinished. Suffering a heavy financial loss himself, and in order to economise, Nicholson left London for Morpeth in Northumberland in 1829, where he lived in a small property left to him by a relative. In the meantime, he published A Popular and Practical Treatise on Masonry and Stone-cutting (1828), in which he solved the problem of cutting stones to the precise shapes required for the construction of a strong skew arch and presented his solution in a form that was useful to other engineers and stonemasons, enabling the stones to be prepared from templates at the quarry in advance of the actual construction of the bridge.

=== Later life ===
In Morpeth, Nicholson started work on a book entitled A Treatise on Dialing in which he described how to prepare and erect sundials, as well as applying trigonometry to the problem of finding the length of the hip of a roof and its rafters from the angle of inclination of its eaves. On 10 August 1832, Nicholson's wife, Jane died, aged 48, and he erected a neat memorial to her in the grounds of the High Church before leaving Morpeth and taking up residence in Carliol Street, Newcastle upon Tyne.

At the age of 67, and still financially embarrassed, Nicholson resumed his writing, finally getting his Treatise on Dialing published in Newcastle in 1833, and set up a school in the recently opened Royal Arcade, which he ran for a few years, though it was not a financial success. He was nevertheless highly regarded by the local people and was awarded honorary memberships of a number of local institutions, including the Newcastle Mechanics' Institute. In 1834, an attempt was made to raise, by public subscription, sufficient funds to purchase an annuity for his benefit, but as only £320 was raised it was deemed insufficient for the purpose and was handed directly to Nicholson to help with his immediate needs, and a petition was sent to the king in an attempt to secure a pension for him from the Privy Purse. In October 1836, he was elected President of the Newcastle Society for the Promotion of the Fine Arts and in August 1838, he presented a paper entitled Principles of Oblique Bridges to the eighth meeting of the British Association for the Advancement of Science, which was held in Newcastle. During the nine years he lived in Newcastle, Nicholson published three more books, his Treatise on Projection (1837) containing his portrait, drawn from life by Edward Train, originally in pen and ink. Nicholson's final work was entitled The Guide to Railway Masonry, containing a Complete Treatise on the Oblique Arch and published on 1 January 1839, the third edition of which also contained the portrait by Train. The contrast between this and the earlier portrait by Green is marked: Green painted a man at the peak of his vigour, while Train drew a much older and poorer man.

Leaving Newcastle for Carlisle on 10 October 1841, aged 76, Nicholson was supported for the remainder of his life by the generosity of Thomas Jamieson, a relative by marriage, of Newton, Northumberland. He died on 18 June 1844 and was buried in the graveyard of Christ Church, which was built in 1830 but has since been demolished. A monument to his memory, designed by Robert William Billings in the form of a pair of interpenetrating obelisks, was erected in Carlisle cemetery in 1865. Nicholson married twice. By his first wife, Jane he had one son, Michael Angelo, author of the Carpenter and Joiner's Companion (1826), who died in 1842, leaving a numerous family; by his second marriage, Nicholson had a daughter, Jessie, who married a Mr Bowen of Bridgewater, and a son, Jamieson T., both of whom survived him.

== Recognition, criticism and legacy ==
=== As a mathematician ===
Nicholson is variously described in his own books as architect, carpenter, surveyor, practical builder and private teacher of mathematics. As a mathematician, he was largely self-taught, later turning to architecture as a means of finding a practical application for the theoretical knowledge he had amassed during his solitary studies.

Having by ardent desire, in early youth, acquired a knowledge of most of the Mathematical Sciences, by application to books, principally from the works of that celebrated mathematician, Mr. Emerson, but, from the want of similar society at that time, and a desire of applying the scientific knowledge I then possessed to useful purposes, I directed my attention to Architecture; and what I have done in this art will sufficiently appear in the works that have been published under my name.

— An Introduction to the Method of Increments, Peter Nicholson, Private Teacher of the Mathematics.

For his work on involution and evolution, Nicholson received the following commendation from the French Académie des Sciences.

French Institute, Royal Academy of Sciences, Paris, 10 July 1820.

Sir,—The Academy has received with a lively degree of interest, the Essay that you obligingly addressed to it on Involution and Evolution, or a Method of determining the Numerical Value of any Function of an unknown Quantity. I am desired, in its name, to thank you for sending this interesting work, which has been honourably placed in the Library of the Academy; and to express the sense of obligation which the Institution entertains for your attention.

Receive, Sir, I beg, the assurance of the most distinguished respect with which I am,

Your's etc.

B.G. Cuvier

— Letter from the Perpetual Secretary to Mr Peter Nicholson.

=== As an architect ===
Although almost entirely forgotten as a mathematician, Nicholson is still remembered as an architect and in the 1978 edition of his standard work, A Biographical Dictionary of British Architects, 1600–1840, Howard M. Colvin claims that

Nicholson was one of the leading intellects behind nineteenth-century building technology. He used his great ability as a mathematician to simplify many old formulae used by architectural draughtsmen as well as to devise new ones.

Colvin continues,

His writings were not confined to theory; although based on scientific principle, they addressed the practical problems faced by building craftsmen. Thus his improvements in the construction of handrailing and the invention of the centrolinead [...] helped to make possible the elegant curved staircases of the late Georgian period.

=== On the skew arch ===
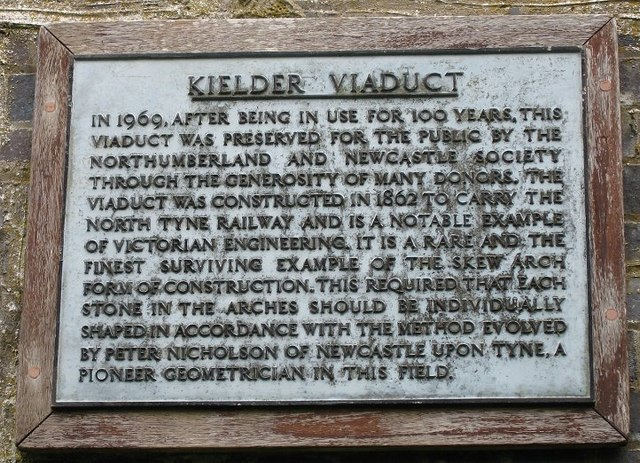
Kielder Viaduct, information plaque

For his work on the skew arch Nicholson received a number of letters of thanks from contractors, engineers and masons, which he published in a Testimonials section of his Guide to Railway Masonry. Kielder Viaduct, a seven arch skew railway bridge built to his pattern, now disused but preserved by the Northumberland and Newcastle Society, carries an information plaque commemorating Nicholson's pioneering work in this field.

Sir,—As one of the contractors [...] for the Tees Bridge, near Croft, on the Great North of England Railway, I beg leave to make the following statements regarding your Guide to Railway Masonry, namely that it is by far the most practically useful and correct method that I have yet seen laid before the public for the construction of an oblique arch; and there was not the least difficulty in finding the templets necessary, as laid down by you, for working the arch-stones of this bridge; and that, when explained to the workmen, they found no difficulty whatever in working the same. In fact, your method renders the working of them nearly as simple as those of a common square arch. [...] I beg leave to thank you for the great pains you have taken in rendering the oblique arch practically easy to most capacities.

— James Hogg, mason

Following his 1836 publication On the Construction of Skew Arches, Charles Fox openly acknowledged Nicholson's contribution while claiming his own to be the superior method.

No one would for a moment hesitate to acknowledge the obligations which practical men are under to that highly talented individual Mr Peter Nicholson; but on referring to his Treatise on Masonry and Stone-cutting (plate 17) it will at once appear that the intrado is the only surface developed, and the approximate line laid down upon it, all the courses are drawn at right angles to that line; the courses therefore are drawn with reference to the intrado only.

— On Mr Peter Nicholson's Rule for the Construction of the Oblique Arch, Charles Fox

In his 1837 publication A Practical and Theoretical Essay on Oblique Bridges, George W. Buck also acknowledged Nicholson's contribution but, finding it lacking in detail, applied his own original trigonometrical approach and considerable practical experience to the problem.

In Nicholson's work on stone cutting, published in 1828, the method of constructing oblique arches with spiral courses is briefly explained, and to it we are indebted for the first principles of the art, but it does not enter sufficiently into detail.

— A Practical and Theoretical Essay on Oblique Bridges, George Watson Buck

The unfavourable comments from Fox and Buck were comparatively mild and tempered in part by their acknowledgement of Nicholson's pioneering work. Nevertheless, Nicholson, by this time in his mid-70s and his health failing, felt the need to exercise his right of reply. A number of people expressed their public support for him, including his friend Henry Welch, the County Bridge Surveyor for Northumberland and an anonymous supporter known only by the initials M.Q. Unfortunately this exchange escalated into a paper war that became increasingly acrimonious, culminating in 1840 in a very personal attack by Buck's assistant, the 28-year-old William Henry Barlow, and causing Nicholson considerable distress.

It is really very lamentable to see a man of the standing Peter Nicholson once had, obliged to have recourse to so mean and unworthy subterfuge; and it is still more lamentable to see him forget himself so much in the language he makes use of. […] Is he ignorant of the fact that Mr. Buck has surmounted this difficulty by the simple expedient of adjusting the angle of the intrado—or is it that, rather than acknowledge his inferiority, he persists in what he knows to be wrong, and addresses his book to the working classes in the hope of escaping detection? […] It is perfectly distressing to see a problem which admits of easy solution so miserably mutilated in his hands. […] Mr. Nicholson's rules however are not only very unnecessarily tedious, but it would appear by his own showing, that they are not over certain in their results. […] However, I will say no more. For this time I have, as he observes, "done with him" and I hope enough has been said to show Mr. Nicholson that his ideas have got a twist in their beds by no means adapted to skew-bridges, and that no species of brow-beating or invective on his part will be of the slightest use to him, while his book [The Guide to Railway Masonry, containing a Complete Treatise on the Oblique Arch, published on 1 January 1839] remains so very imperfect.

— On the Construction of Oblique Arches, William Henry Barlow

=== By his fellow citizens ===
A measure of the high esteem in which Nicholson was held by the residents of Newcastle and their sense of injustice at his financial plight can be gauged from the petition sent to the king in an unsuccessful attempt to obtain a pension on his behalf.

The works of Peter Nicholson, while they have contributed to the advancement of knowledge, have tended to raise the English mechanic to that pre-eminence he has attained over the other artificers of Europe; and while they have been honoured with the proudest marks of distinction by the various learned societies of this kingdom, have yet failed to produce to their author those benefits which are necessary for his existence; and it must ever be a source of regret that an individual who, having devoted his best energies to the advancement of science, should be left at the close of a long and laborious life, and in his seventy-third year, to struggle in penury and want.

— Petition from the people of Newcastle to H. M. King William IV on behalf of Peter Nicholson

== Publications ==
Nicholson was a prolific writer, contributing practical information on a wide range of technical subjects in 27 works.

- The Carpenter's New Guide (1792, his first publication at the age of 27).
- Principles of Architecture (in three volumes between 1794 and 1798).
- The Student's Instructor in Drawing and Working the Five Orders of Architecture (1795).
- The Carpenter and Joiner's Assistant (1797).
- Mechanical Exercises (1812). This book was re-published in 1831 as The Mechanic's Companion.
- The Architectural Dictionary (in two volumes between 1812 and 1819). This book was re-published in an expanded form in 1852 as the Encyclopædia of Architecture.
- A Treatise on Practical Perspective (1815).
- An Introduction to the Method of Increments (1817).
- Essays on the Combinatorial Analysis (1818).
- The Rudiments of Algebra (1819).
- Essay on Involution and Evolution (1820, for which he received the commendation of the Académie des Sciences in Paris).
- A Treatise on the Construction of Staircases and Handrails (1820).
- Analytical and Arithmetical Essays (1821).
- The Builder and Workman's New Director (1822).
- A Popular Course of Pure and Mixed Mathematics (1823, price 21s).
- The New Practical Builder, and Workman's Companion (1823).
- The Practical Builder's Perpetual Price-book (1823).
- A Practical System of Algebra (1824, with John Rowbotham).
- The Practical Cabinet-maker, Upholsterer, and Complete Decorator (1826, with Michael Angelo Nicholson, his elder son).
- The Carpenter and Builder's Complete Measurer (1826, intended as a sequel to the Carpenter's Guide).
- Practical Carpentry, Joinery and Cabinet-making (1826).
- In 1827 he commenced the publication of a work entitled The School of Architecture and Engineering, which he intended to complete in twelve volumes, at 1s 6d each; but, following the bankruptcy of the publisher, only five volumes appeared, causing Nicholson a considerable personal financial loss.
- A Popular and Practical Treatise on Masonry and Stone-cutting (1828).
- A Treatise on Dialing (1833).
- A Treatise on Projection (1837).
- Practical Masonry, Bricklaying, and Plastering (1838).
- The Guide to Railway Masonry, containing a Complete Treatise on the Oblique Arch (1839).

Nicholson also edited and revised later editions of the following publications by other authors.

- An Essay on the Teeth of Wheels by Robertson Buchanan (1808).

He also contributed several articles to Rees's Cyclopædia.

- Architecture (vol. 2, 1802–1803)
- Carpentry (vol. 6, 1806)
- Joinery (vol. 19, 1811)
- Panorama (vol. 26, 1813–1814)
- Perspective (vol. 26, 1813–1814)
- Projection (vol. 28, 1814)
- Proportional Compasses (vol. 28, 1814)
- Shadows (vol. 32, 1815–1816)
- Stereography (vol. 34, 1816)
- Stereometry (vol. 34, 1816)
