= Weather compensation =

Technique for adjusting heating systems to reflect the outside weather

Weather compensation is a technique for adjusting heating systems to reflect the outside weather, using weather compensation controls.

If the outside temperature drops, it will increase the temperature of the heating medium (typically, water or air) in the heating system.

These systems reduce fuel usage, mostly by predicting demand, and modifying heating in advance of the change to the interior temperature. The system can also understand the different responses of various parts of the property to exterior conditions, and compensate for that. Additional savings can result from the system understanding the expected demand, and hence avoiding wasting energy heating rooms with open windows, for example.
