= James Hann =

English mathematician, teacher and textbook writer

James Hann (1799–1856) was an English mathematician, teacher and textbook writer.

== Life ==
Hann was born at Washington, County Durham, where his father was a colliery smith. After working as a fireman at a pumping-station at Hebburn, he was for several years on one of the steamers used on the Tyne River for towing vessels. He studied mathematics, in particular the works of William Emerson the fluxionist.

Hann then became a teacher, and kept a school at Friar's Goose, near Newcastle. An acquaintanceship with Wesley S. B. Woolhouse the mathematician led to Hann's obtaining a situation as calculator in the Nautical Almanac Office. A few years later he was appointed writing-master, and then shortly mathematical master at King's College School, London; this post he held till his death. Among his pupils was Henry Fawcett.

Hann was elected a member of the Institution of Civil Engineers in 1843, and was an honorary member of the Philosophical Society of Newcastle-on-Tyne. He died in King's College Hospital 17 August 1856, aged 57 years.

== Works ==
In applied mathematics Hann wrote:

- Mathematics for Practical Men, published 1833, with Isaac Dodds of Gateshead, a friend and owner of one of the steamers on which Hann worked;
- The Theory of Bridges, 1843, with William Hosking;
- Treatise on the Steam Engine, with Practical Rules, 1847, for John Weale;
- Principles and Practice of the Machinery of Locomotive Engines, 1850, for Weale.

In 1841, with Olinthus Gregory, Hann drew up and published Tables for the Use of Nautical Men. He also contributed papers to the Diaries and other mathematical periodicals.

Hann published on mechanics and pure mathematics, works in these areas being for Weale's Rudimentary Series:

- Analytical Geometry (later reworked by John Radford Young);
- Treatise on Plane Trigonometry;
- Spherical Trigonometry;
- Examples of the Integral Calculus;
- Examples of the Differential Calculus.

== Family ==
Hann married as a young Man, and had several Children.

== Notes ==
Attribution

This article incorporates text from a publication now in the public domain: Stephen, Leslie; Lee, Sidney, eds. (1890). "Hann, James". Dictionary of National Biography. Vol. 24. London: Smith, Elder & Co.
