= Forced-air gas =

Type of building heating system

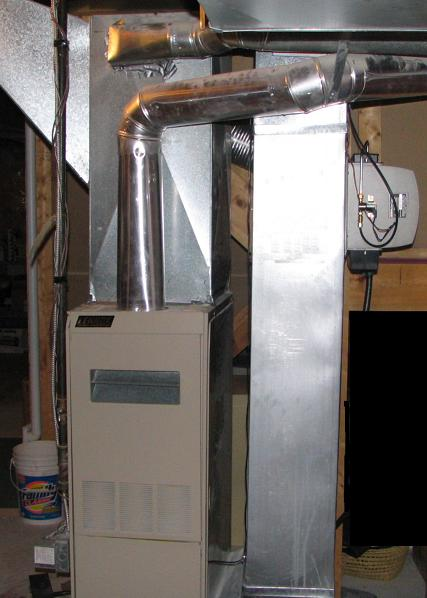
A forced-air gas furnace, of the older, non-condensing type

Forced-air gas heating systems are used in central air heating/cooling systems for houses. Sometimes the system is referred to as "forced hot air".

== Design ==
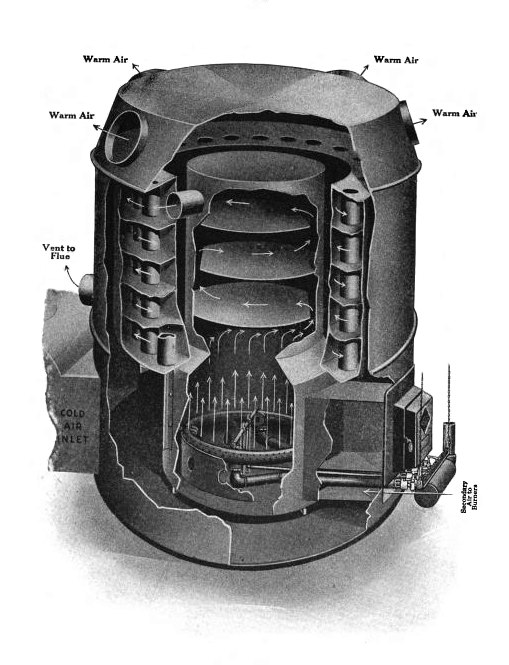
Older furnaces sometimes relied on gravity instead of a blower to circulate air.

Gas-fired forced-air furnaces have a burner in the furnace fueled by natural gas. A blower forces cold air through a heat exchanger and then through duct-work that distributes the hot air through the building. Each room has an outlet from the duct system, often mounted in the floor or low on the wall – some rooms will also have an opening into the cold air return duct. Depending on the age of the system, forced-air gas furnaces use either a pilot light or a solid-state ignition system (spark or hot surface ignition) to light the natural gas burner. The natural gas is fed to buildings from a main gas line. The duct work supplying the hot air (and sometimes cool air if an AC unit is tied into the system) may be insulated. A thermostat starts and stops the furnace to regulate temperature. Large homes or commercial buildings may have multiple thermostats and heating zones, controlled by powered dampers. A digital thermostat can be programmed to activate the gas furnace at certain times. For example, a resident may want the temperature in their dwelling to rise 15 minutes before returning from work.

Simple types of gas-fired furnace lose significant amounts of energy in the hot waste gases. High-efficiency condensing furnaces condense the water vapor (one of the by-products of gas combustion) and extract the latent heat to pre-heat the incoming furnace airflow, using a second heat exchanger. This increases the efficiency (energy delivered into the building vs. heating value of gas purchased) to over 90%. An incidental beneficial effect is that the exhaust flue is much smaller and can be made of plastic pipe since the exhaust gas is much cooler. As a result it can be more easily routed through walls or floors. However, the condensing furnace is more expensive initially because of the extra induced-draft fan and condensate pump required, and the extra heat exchanger in the firebox.

The heat exchangers may be damaged by corrosion or metal fatigue from many heating and cooling cycles. A small leak of combustion gases into the heated air can be dangerous to the occupants of the heated space, because of possible carbon monoxide build up.

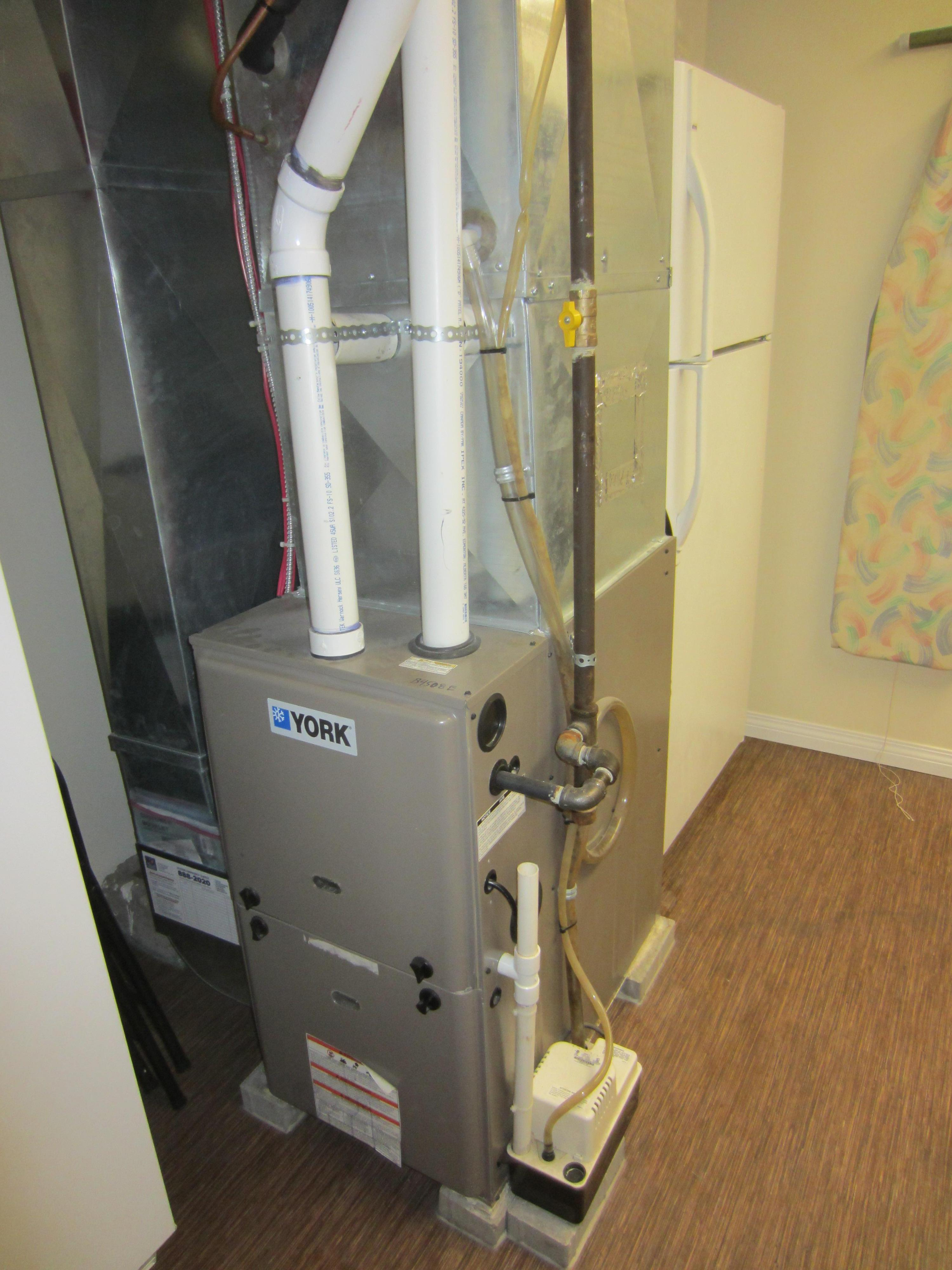
A condensing forced-air furnace; flue pipes are plastic, not metal, because of the low waste-gas temperature.

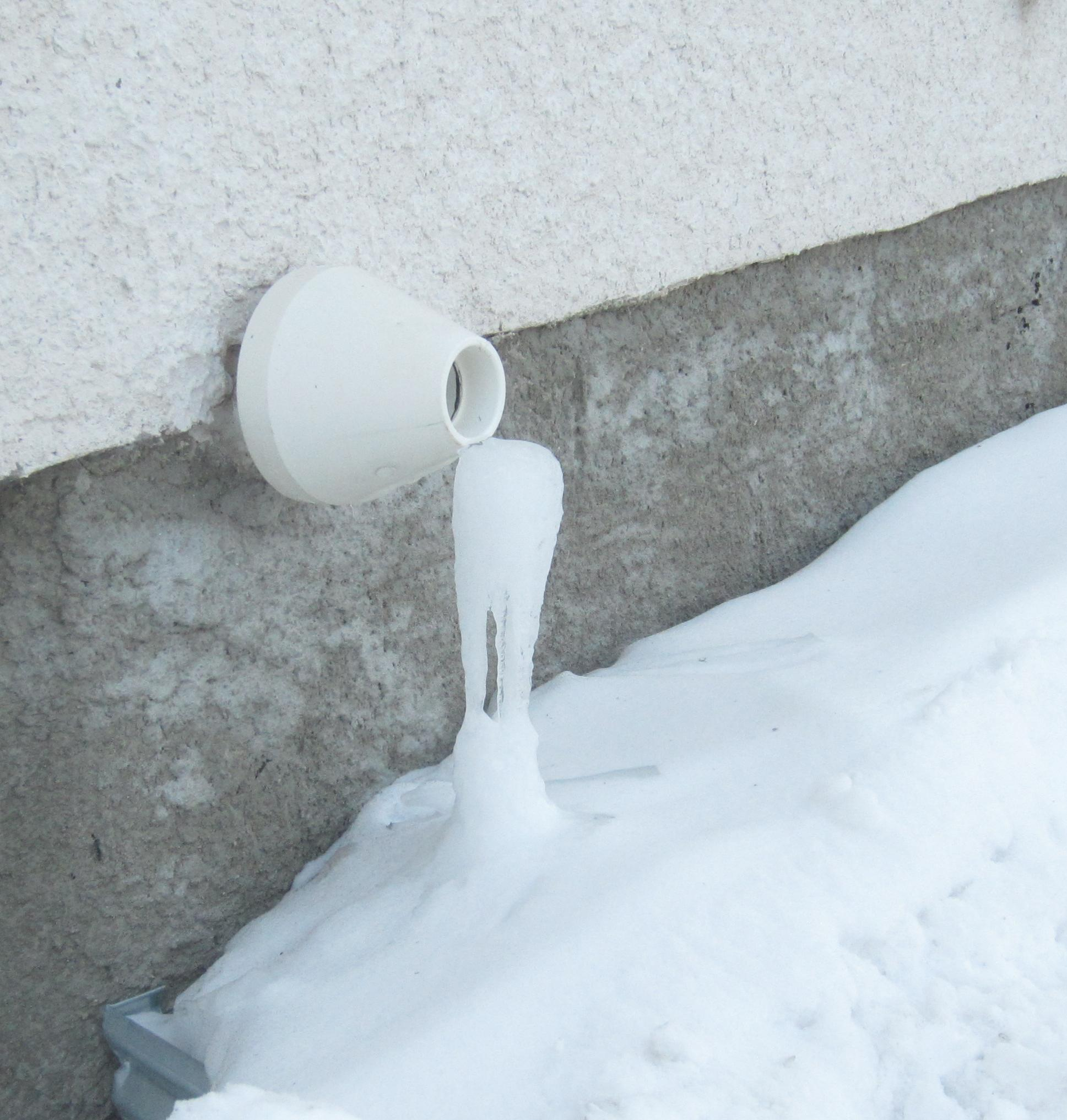
Plastic outlet for a condensing natural gas hot air furnace. Not all the water vapor is condensed; some freezes at the outlet. This vent contains a coaxial combustion air inlet pipe. Blowing snow can block the pipe, but the furnace control can detect this condition and prevent the burner from starting.

== Areas of usage ==
Residential and commercial buildings located in rural and remote areas do not often use natural gas forced hot air systems. This is due to the financial impracticality of running natural gas lines many miles past areas of relatively sparse habitation. Usually these rural and remote buildings use oil heat or propane, which is delivered by a truck and stored in a tank on the property.
