= Data furnace =

Heating method

The data furnace is a method of heating residential homes or offices by running computers in them, which release considerable amounts of waste heat. Data furnaces can theoretically be cheaper than storing computers in huge data centers because the higher cost of electricity in residential areas (when compared to industrial zones) can be offset by charging the home owner for the heat that the data center gives off. Some large companies that store and process thousands of gigabytes of data believe that data furnaces could be cheaper because there would be little to no overhead costs. The cost of a traditional data storage center is up to around $400 per server, whereas the overhead cost per server of a home data furnace is around $10. Individuals had already begun using computers as a heat source by 2011.

== Usefulness ==
The first kind of data furnace (DF) could be a low cost seasonal DF. This kind of DF would use an existing broadband connection to perform delay-tolerant jobs such as content indexing or the processing of large sets of scientific data. The server will only come on and start heating and processing when the house needs heat. The second kind of DF would be the low bandwidth neighborhood DF. This option can provide faster computations as it can run at all times, but this increases the risk of overheating. To get around this problem there may be vents to the outside added to the server racks to get rid of some of the unneeded heat. The third option would be an eco-friendly urban DF. This option, much like the second, runs year round and can vent excess heat to the outside. This would be an advantage for service providers to expand into urban areas more quickly, so long as the applications scale to the number of servers. This option causes a new challenge, because since it runs year round, the cost of electricity to run the servers cannot be offset by billing the home owners for the heat that they use as it will be little to none.

== Energy requirements ==
For a data furnace heating water, the heating needs to be at least 56 °C (133 °F) to prevent the development of pathogens while limiting the risks of skin damage. Regarding space heating radiators, a temperature of 50–60 °C (122–140 °F) is suitable for a radiator embedding processors as long as the heating surface is of significant size to dissipate the heat.

== Security ==
There are concerns about the security of these servers, as they would be stored on private properties unmonitored. Unlike traditional data centers that are constantly monitored, data furnaces should be treated as the most insecure environment for data storage. For the best security, each server would have a device to prevent tampering. Furthermore, all of the data on these servers would have to be encrypted so that no one except the person requesting the data would have access to it.

== Applications ==
A few companies are commercialising this concept around the world. A German company Cloud&Heat offers hot water heated by a distributed data center installed in the premises. French company Qarnot computing developed a radiator that heats with embedded processors and sells the computing power generated.

Major tech companies like Microsoft and Google have begun exploring the integration of data furnaces in their sustainability initiatives to reduce the environmental impact of their data centers. Microsoft's 2024 Environmental Sustainability Report highlights their ongoing efforts to incorporate innovative solutions, including data furnaces, to achieve carbon neutrality and improve energy efficiency across their operations
