= Robertson Buchanan =

Scottish civil engineer (1770–1816)

Robertson Buchanan (1770–1816) was a Scottish civil engineer from Glasgow.

== Life ==
He was the son of the Glasgow merchant George Buchanan, and his first wife Jane Gorvie. In the early 1790s he was working at Rothesay for David Dale. His interests spread out from mill machinery, to pumps and heating. He also went into bridge construction.

In 1808 Buchanan was working for Henry Houldsworth at Cranstonhill, building a large waterworks. The following year he set up in business at Port Dundas, and in 1810 he became a burgess of Glasgow. In 1811 he was working on an early railway proposal in Scotland, to run from Dumfries to Sanquhar.

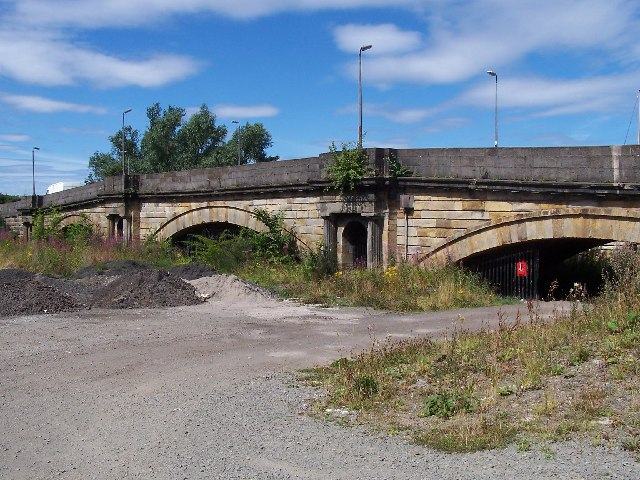
Old White Cart Bridge, Inchinnan, designed by Robertson Buchanan. It is now a landlocked listed building.

Buchanan died on 22 July 1816, at the house of Alexander Innes (a father to one of Buchanan's stepmothers) of Creech St Michael, near Taunton, in his forty-sixth year.

== Works ==
Buchanan was a working engineer in mills who was also interested in their theory. Some of his publications were based on experience in cotton mills. He was the author of:

- Essays on the Economy of Fuel and Management of Heat, 1810;
- A Practical Treatise on Propelling Vessels by Steam, Glasgow, 1816; and of
- Practical Essays on Millwork and other Machinery, Mechanical and Descriptive, 3 vols. published in 1814; edition by Thomas Tredgold, 1841; supplement to third edition by George Rennie, 1843.

He also contributed papers to the Philosophical Magazine and Edinburgh Encyclopædia.
