= Significant New Alternatives Policy =

EPA program covering regulated chemicals

The Significant New Alternatives Policy (also known as Section 612 of the Clean Air Act or SNAP, promulgated at 40 CFR part 82 Subpart G) is a program of the EPA to determine acceptable chemical substitutes, and establish which are prohibited or regulated by the EPA. It also establishes a program by which new alternatives may be accepted, and promulgates timelines to the industry regarding phase-outs of substitutes.

== Scope ==
Originally, Section 612 was limited by ozone-depleting chemicals. However, after passing regulations to phase-out R134a, an HFC refrigerant with no ozone-depleting potential, this phase-out was defended by a subsidiary of DuPont siding with the EPA as it was challenged by a major manufacturer of R134a, and was struck down in 2017. This decision was upheld in 2018. In 2021, a new law was passed as part of the appropriations bill extending the EPA's scope to substances with high GWP as well.

The EPA looks at available chemical substitutes in the following industrial sectors:

- Adhesives, Coatings, and Inks
- Aerosols
- Cleaning Solvents
- Fire Suppression and Explosion Protection
- Foam Blowing Agents
- Refrigeration and Air Conditioning
- Sterilants
- Tobacco Expansion

Evaluations are ongoing as technological understanding improves, and can only prohibit substance where the EPA has determined other available substitutes that pose less overall risk to human health and the environment.

== Submittal process ==
In order to submit new proposed chemicals, along with general contact and marketing information, for a complete submittal, the EPA requires reports on:

- Impurities
- Byproducts
- Degradation Products
- Test Marketing
- Physical Properties including:
  - molecular weight
  - physical state
  - melting point
  - boiling point
  - specific gravity
  - If a blend
    - bubble point
    - dew point
  - If flammable
    - lower flammability limit
    - upper flammability limit
    - flash point
- Ozone Depletion Potential (ODP)
- Global Warming Potential (GWP)
- VOC content
- Proposed cost
- Toxicity Limits
  - Permissible Exposure Limits (PELs)
  - Short-Term Exposure Limits (STELs)
  - Threshold Limit Values (TLVs)
  - Recommended Exposure Limits (RELs)
  - Workplace Environmental Exposure Limits (WEELs)
  - acceptable exposure limits (AELs)
  - Toxicological studies
- SDS
- Environmental/Health and Safety Law Review
- Industry/Application-specific Use Profile

== Refrigerants ==
One important, changing aspect of SNAP is its effect on the HVAC industry. Particularly because it decides which refrigerants may be legally used, it coordinates refrigerant phaseouts in the U.S., and which are prohibited against venting in concordance with Section 608. The following is a list of accepted refrigerants, or phase-out periods according to the EPA.

	MVAC Passenger Air Conditioning in Vehicles	MVAC Passenger Air Conditioning in Buses and Trains	Centrifugal Chillers	Positive Displacement Chillers	Industrial Process Refrigeration	Cold Storage Warehouse	Commercial Ice Machines	Household Refrigerators and Freezers	Ice Skating Rinks	Industrial Process Air Conditioning	Residential and Light Commercial Air Conditioning and Heat Pumps	Residential Dehumidifiers	Refrigerated Transport	Stand Alone Equipment	Refrigerated Food Processing and Dispensing Equipment	Remote Condensing Units	Typical Supermarket Systems	Vending machines	Very Low Temperature Refrigeration	Water Coolers
Ammonia / Water Absorption			Acceptable																	
Ammonia Absorption			Acceptable	Acceptable	Acceptable	Acceptable	Acceptable	Acceptable	Acceptable	Acceptable	Acceptable									
Ammonia Vapor Compression			Acceptable		Acceptable	Acceptable	Acceptable		Acceptable	Acceptable										
Ammonia Vapor Compression with Secondary Loop			Acceptable	Acceptable										Acceptable	Acceptable	Acceptable	Acceptable			
Chlorine					Acceptable															
Cryogenic Transport Refrigeration System													Acceptable							
Desiccant Cooling			Acceptable	Acceptable	Acceptable	Acceptable				Acceptable	Acceptable									
Direct Nitrogen Expansion					Acceptable								Acceptable							
Evaporative Cooling	Acceptable	Acceptable	Acceptable	Acceptable	Acceptable	Acceptable				Acceptable	Acceptable									
FOR12A			Unacceptable in new equipment, except as otherwise allowed under a narrowed use limit, as of January 1, 2024.	Unacceptable in new equipment, except as otherwise allowed under a narrowed use limit, as of January 1, 2024.	Acceptable	Acceptable	Acceptable	Unacceptable in new equipment, as of January 1, 2021.		Acceptable			Acceptable	Unacceptable	Acceptable	Acceptable	Acceptable	Unacceptable in new equipment as of January 1, 2019.		Acceptable
FOR12B			Unacceptable in new equipment, except as otherwise allowed under a narrowed use limit, as of January 1, 2024.	Unacceptable in new equipment, except as otherwise allowed under a narrowed use limit, as of January 1, 2024.	Acceptable	Acceptable	Acceptable	Unacceptable in new equipment, as of January 1, 2021.		Acceptable			Acceptable	Unacceptable	Acceptable	Acceptable	Acceptable	Unacceptable in new equipment as of January 1, 2019		Acceptable
Freeze 12	Unacceptable as of MY 2017.	Acceptable	Acceptable	Acceptable	Acceptable	Acceptable	Acceptable	Acceptable	Acceptable			Acceptable	Acceptable	Acceptable	Acceptable	Acceptable	Acceptable	Acceptable		Acceptable
G2018C			Acceptable	Acceptable	Acceptable	Acceptable	Acceptable		Acceptable				Acceptable	Acceptable		Acceptable	Acceptable	Acceptable		Acceptable
GHG-HP	Unacceptable as of MY 2017.			Acceptable	Acceptable	Acceptable	Acceptable	Acceptable				Acceptable	Acceptable	Acceptable	Acceptable	Acceptable	Acceptable	Acceptable		Acceptable
GHG-X5	Unacceptable as of MY 2017.		Acceptable	Acceptable	Acceptable	Acceptable	Acceptable	Acceptable				Acceptable	Acceptable	Acceptable	Acceptable	Acceptable	Acceptable	Acceptable		Acceptable
HC Blend A					Acceptable															
HC Blend B					Acceptable															
HCFC-123			Acceptable		Acceptable															
HCFC-124			Acceptable							Acceptable										
HCFC-22			Acceptable	Acceptable	Acceptable	Acceptable	Acceptable		Acceptable	Acceptable		Acceptable	Acceptable	Acceptable	Acceptable	Acceptable	Acceptable	Acceptable		Acceptable
HCFC-22/HCFC-142b			Acceptable	Acceptable	Acceptable	Acceptable	Acceptable	Acceptable				Acceptable	Acceptable	Acceptable	Acceptable	Acceptable	Acceptable	Acceptable		Acceptable
HCFO-1233zd(E)					Acceptable	Acceptable			Acceptable	Acceptable										
HFC-134a	Unacceptable as of Model Year (MY) 2021, except where allowed under a narrowed use limit through MY 2025. Unacceptable for all newly manufactured vehicles as of MY 2026.	Acceptable	Unacceptable in new equipment, except as otherwise allowed under a narrowed use limit for military marine vessels and human-rated spacecraft and related support equipment, as of January 1, 2024.	Unacceptable in new equipment, except as otherwise allowed under a narrowed use limit for military marine vessels and human-rated spacecraft and related support equipment, as of January 1, 2024.	Acceptable	Acceptable	Acceptable	Unacceptable in new equipment, as of January 1, 2021.	Acceptable	Acceptable, Applicable to new uses below 125 degrees F ambient	Acceptable	Acceptable	Acceptable	Unacceptable	Acceptable	Acceptable	Acceptable	Unacceptable in new equipment as of January 1, 2019.		Acceptable
HFC-134a/HBr (92/8)					Acceptable	Acceptable: Only acceptable for use as the primary heat transfer fluid in secondary-loop equipment for not-in-kind replacements.							Acceptable	Acceptable: Only acceptable for use as the primary heat transfer fluid in secondary-loop equipment for not-in-kind replacements.	Acceptable: Only acceptable for use as the primary heat transfer fluid in secondary-loop equipment for not-in-kind replacements.	Acceptable: Only acceptable for use as the primary heat transfer fluid in secondary-loop equipment for not-in-kind replacements.	Acceptable: Only acceptable for use as the primary heat transfer fluid in secondary-loop equipment for not-in-kind replacements.			
HFC-152a	Acceptable with Use Conditions							Acceptable												
HFC-227ea			Unacceptable, except as otherwise allowed under a narrowed use limit, as of January 1, 2024.	Unacceptable in new equipment, except as otherwise allowed under a narrowed use limit, as of January 1, 2024.	Acceptable with Use Conditions: When manufactured using any process that does not convert perfluoroisobutylene (PFIB) directly to HFC-236fa in a single step.	Unacceptable in new equipment as of January 1, 2023.								Unacceptable	Unacceptable in new equipment as of January 1, 2021.	Unacceptable in new equipment as of January 1, 2017	Unacceptable in new equipment as of January 1, 2017			
HFC-23					Acceptable														Acceptable	
HFC-32											Acceptable with Use Conditions									
HFC-236fa			Unacceptable in new equipment, except as otherwise allowed under a narrowed use limit, as of January 1, 2024.		Acceptable															
HFC-245fa			Unacceptable in new equipment, except as otherwise allowed under a narrowed use limit, as of January 1, 2024.		Acceptable					Acceptable									Acceptable	
HFE-347mcc3 (heptafluoropropyl methyl ether)					Acceptable														Acceptable	
HFE-449s1 (methoxynonafluorobutane, iso and normal)					Acceptable: Only acceptable for use as a secondary heat transfer fluid in not-in-kind systems.									Acceptable: Only acceptable for use as a secondary heat transfer fluid in not-in-kind systems.	Acceptable: Only acceptable for use as a secondary heat transfer fluid in not-in-kind systems.	Acceptable: Only acceptable for use as a secondary heat transfer fluid in not-in-kind systems.	Acceptable: Only acceptable for use as the primary heat transfer fluid in secondary-loop equipment for not-in-kind replacements.		Acceptable: Only acceptable for use as a secondary heat transfer fluid in not-in-kind systems.	
HFE-569sf2 (ethoxynonafluorobutane, iso and normal)					Acceptable: Only acceptable for use as a secondary heat transfer fluid in not-in-kind systems.									Acceptable: Only acceptable for use as a secondary heat transfer fluid in not-in-kind systems.		Acceptable: Only acceptable for use as a secondary heat transfer fluid in not-in-kind systems.	Acceptable: Only acceptable for use as the primary heat transfer fluid in secondary-loop equipment for not-in-kind replacements.		Acceptable: Only acceptable for use as a secondary heat transfer fluid in not-in-kind systems.	
HFO-1234ze			Acceptable	Acceptable																
HFO-1336mzz(Z) ((Z)-1,1,1,4,4,4-hexafluorobut-2-ene)			Acceptable	Acceptable						Acceptable										
HFO-1336mzz(Z)/dichloroethylene blend (R-514A)			Acceptable	Acceptable																
Ikon A	Acceptable with Use Conditions		Acceptable	Acceptable	Acceptable	Acceptable	Acceptable	Acceptable		Acceptable			Acceptable	Acceptable	Acceptable	Acceptable	Acceptable	Acceptable		Acceptable
Ikon B			Acceptable	Acceptable	Acceptable	Acceptable	Acceptable	Acceptable		Acceptable		Acceptable	Acceptable	Acceptable	Acceptable	Acceptable	Acceptable	Acceptable	Acceptable	Acceptable
ISCEON 89																			Acceptable	
NARM-502					Acceptable														Acceptable	
Pressure stepdown						Acceptable														
R-1224yd(Z)			Acceptable	Acceptable	Acceptable															
R-125/R-134a/R-600a (28.1/70.0/1.9)		Acceptable	Unacceptable in new equipment, except as otherwise allowed under a narrowed use limit, as of January 1, 2024.	Unacceptable in new equipment, except as otherwise allowed under a narrowed use limit, as of January 1, 2024.	Acceptable					Acceptable	Acceptable	Acceptable	Acceptable						Acceptable	
R-125/R-290/R-134a/R-600a (55.0/1.0/42.5/1.5)			Unacceptable in new equipment, except as otherwise allowed under a narrowed use limit, as of January 1, 2024.	Unacceptable in new equipment, except as otherwise allowed under a narrowed use limit, as of January 1, 2024.	Acceptable	Unacceptable in new equipment as of January 1, 2023.	Acceptable	Unacceptable in new equipment, as of January 1, 2021.	Acceptable	Acceptable	Acceptable	Acceptable	Acceptable	Unacceptable	Unacceptable in new equipment as of January 1, 2021.	Acceptable	Acceptable	Unacceptable in new equipment as of January 1, 2019		Acceptable
R-170 (Ethane)																			Acceptable with Use Conditions	
R-1270 (Propylene)			Unacceptable as of January 3, 2017.	Unacceptable as of January 3, 2017.	Acceptable	Unacceptable, as of January 3, 2017.					Unacceptable, as of January 3, 2017.									
R-290 (Propane)					Acceptable		Acceptable with Use Conditions	Acceptable with Use Conditions			Acceptable with Use Conditions: For use in self-contained room air conditioningee rule for detailed conditions			Acceptable with Use Conditions				Acceptable with Use Conditions	Acceptable with Use Conditions	Acceptable with Use Conditions
R-401A				Acceptable	Acceptable	Acceptable	Acceptable	Acceptable	Acceptable	Acceptable		Acceptable	Acceptable	Acceptable	Acceptable	Acceptable	Acceptable	Acceptable		Acceptable
R-401B				Acceptable	Acceptable	Acceptable	Acceptable	Acceptable	Acceptable	Acceptable		Acceptable	Acceptable	Acceptable	Acceptable	Acceptable	Acceptable	Acceptable		Acceptable
R-402A					Acceptable	Acceptable	Acceptable	Acceptable					Acceptable	Acceptable	Acceptable	Acceptable	Acceptable			
R-402B					Acceptable	Acceptable	Acceptable	Acceptable					Acceptable	Acceptable	Acceptable	Acceptable	Acceptable			
R-403B					Acceptable														Acceptable	
R-404A			Unacceptable in new equipment, except as otherwise allowed under a narrowed use limit for human-rated spacecraft and related support equipment, as of January 1, 2024.	Unacceptable in new equipment, except as otherwise allowed under a narrowed use limit for human-rated spacecraft and related support equipment, as of January 1, 2024.	Acceptable	Unacceptable in new equipment as of January 1, 2023.	Acceptable	Unacceptable in new equipment, as of January 1, 2021.	Acceptable	Acceptable	Acceptable	Acceptable	Acceptable	Unacceptable	Unacceptable in new equipment as of January 1, 2021.	Unacceptable in retrofit equipment as of July 20, 2016.Unacceptable in new equipment as of January 1, 2018	Unacceptable in retrofit equipment as of July 20, 2016. Unacceptable in new equipment as of January 1, 2017.	Unacceptable in retrofit equipment as of July 20, 2016.Unacceptable in new equipment as of January 1, 2019.	Acceptable	Acceptable
R-406A	Unacceptable as of MY 2017		Acceptable		Acceptable	Acceptable	Acceptable	Acceptable				Acceptable	Acceptable	Acceptable	Acceptable	Acceptable	Acceptable	Acceptable		Acceptable
R-407A					Acceptable	Unacceptable in new equipment as of January 1, 2023.	Acceptable	Unacceptable in new equipment, as of January 1, 2021.	Acceptable		Acceptable		Acceptable	Unacceptable	Unacceptable in new equipment as of January 1, 2021.	Acceptable	Acceptable			
R-407B					Acceptable	Unacceptable in new equipment as of January 1, 2023.	Acceptable		Acceptable				Acceptable	Unacceptable	Unacceptable in new equipment as of January 1, 2021.	Unacceptable in retrofit equipment as of July 20, 2016.Unacceptable in new equipment as of January 1, 2018	Unacceptable in retrofit equipment as of July 20, 2016. Unacceptable in new equipment as of January 1, 2017.			
R-407C		Acceptable	Unacceptable in new equipment, except as otherwise allowed under a narrowed use limit, as of January 1, 2024.	Unacceptable in new equipment, except as otherwise allowed under a narrowed use limit, as of January 1, 2024.	Acceptable	Acceptable	Acceptable		Acceptable	Acceptable	Acceptable	Acceptable	Acceptable	Unacceptable	Unacceptable in new equipment as of January 1, 2021.	Acceptable	Acceptable	Unacceptable in new equipment as of January 1, 2019.	Acceptable	Acceptable
R-407D													Acceptable							
R-407F		Acceptable			Acceptable	Acceptable	Acceptable	Unacceptable in new equipment, as of January 1, 2021.	Acceptable	Acceptable	Acceptable		Acceptable	Unacceptable	Unacceptable in new equipment as of January 1, 2021.	Acceptable	Acceptable			
R-407H													Acceptable: For use in refrigerated trucks and trailers only		Acceptable	Acceptable	Acceptable			
R-408A					Acceptable	Acceptable	Acceptable						Acceptable	Acceptable	Acceptable	Acceptable	Acceptable			
R-409A							Acceptable	Acceptable				Acceptable	Acceptable	Acceptable	Acceptable	Acceptable	Acceptable	Acceptable		Acceptable
R-410A		Acceptable	Unacceptable, except as otherwise allowed under a narrowed use limit, as of January 1, 2024.	Unacceptable in new equipment, except as otherwise allowed under a narrowed use limit, as of January 1, 2024.	Acceptable	Unacceptable in new equipment as of January 1, 2023.	Acceptable	Unacceptable in new equipment, as of January 1, 2021.	Acceptable	Acceptable	Acceptable	Acceptable	Acceptable	Unacceptable	Unacceptable in new equipment as of January 1, 2021.	Acceptable	Acceptable	Unacceptable in new equipment as of January 1, 2019	Acceptable	Acceptable
R-410B			Unacceptable, except as otherwise allowed under a narrowed use limit, as of January 1, 2024.	Unacceptable in new equipment, except as otherwise allowed under a narrowed use limit, as of January 1, 2024.	Acceptable	Unacceptable in new equipment as of January 1, 2023.	Acceptable	Unacceptable in new equipment, as of January 1, 2021.	Acceptable	Acceptable	Acceptable	Acceptable	Acceptable	Unacceptable	Unacceptable in new equipment as of January 1, 2021.	Acceptable	Acceptable	Unacceptable in new equipment as of January 1, 2019	Acceptable	Acceptable
R-411A				Acceptable	Acceptable	Acceptable	Acceptable						Acceptable	Acceptable	Acceptable	Acceptable	Acceptable	Acceptable		Acceptable
R-411B				Acceptable	Acceptable	Acceptable	Acceptable						Acceptable	Acceptable	Acceptable	Acceptable	Acceptable	Acceptable		Acceptable
R-414A	Unacceptable as of MY 2017.	Acceptable	Acceptable	Acceptable	Acceptable	Acceptable	Acceptable	Acceptable	Acceptable			Acceptable	Acceptable	Acceptable	Acceptable	Acceptable	Acceptable	Acceptable		Acceptable
R-414B	Unacceptable as of MY 2017.	Acceptable	Acceptable	Acceptable	Acceptable	Acceptable	Acceptable	Acceptable	Acceptable	Acceptable		Acceptable	Acceptable	Acceptable		Acceptable	Acceptable	Acceptable		Acceptable
R-416A	Unacceptable as of MY 2017.		Acceptable	Acceptable	Acceptable	Acceptable	Acceptable	Acceptable				Acceptable	Acceptable	Acceptable		Acceptable	Acceptable	Acceptable		Acceptable
R-417A		Acceptable	Unacceptable in new equipment, except as otherwise allowed under a narrowed use limit, as of January 1, 2024.	Unacceptable in new equipment, except as otherwise allowed under a narrowed use limit, as of January 1, 2024.	Acceptable	Unacceptable in new equipment as of January 1, 2023.	Acceptable	Unacceptable in new equipment, as of January 1, 2021.	Acceptable	Acceptable	Acceptable		Acceptable	Unacceptable	Unacceptable in new equipment as of January 1, 2021.	Acceptable	Acceptable	Unacceptable in new equipment as of January 1, 2019		Acceptable
R-417C			Acceptable	Acceptable	Acceptable	Acceptable	Acceptable		Acceptable		Acceptable	Acceptable	Acceptable	Acceptable	Acceptable	Acceptable	Acceptable	Acceptable		
R-420A			Acceptable	Acceptable	Acceptable	Acceptable	Acceptable	Acceptable	Acceptable	Acceptable		Acceptable		Acceptable	Acceptable	Acceptable	Acceptable	Acceptable		Acceptable
R-421A			Unacceptable in new equipment, except as otherwise allowed under a narrowed use limit, as of January 1, 2024.	Unacceptable in new equipment, except as otherwise allowed under a narrowed use limit, as of January 1, 2024.	Acceptable	Unacceptable in new equipment as of January 1, 2023.	Acceptable	Unacceptable in new equipment, as of January 1, 2021.	Acceptable	Acceptable	Acceptable	Acceptable	Acceptable	Unacceptable	Unacceptable in new equipment as of January 1, 2021.	Acceptable	Acceptable	Unacceptable in new equipment as of January 1, 2019		Acceptable
R-421B					Acceptable	Unacceptable in new equipment as of January 1, 2023.	Acceptable	Unacceptable in new equipment, as of January 1, 2021.	Acceptable	Acceptable			Acceptable	Unacceptable	Unacceptable in new equipment as of January 1, 2021.	Unacceptable in retrofit equipment as of July 20, 2016.Unacceptable in new equipment as of January 1, 2018	Unacceptable in retrofit equipment as of July 20, 2016. Unacceptable in new equipment as of January 1, 2017.			Acceptable
R-422A					Acceptable	Unacceptable in new equipment as of January 1, 2023.	Acceptable	Unacceptable in new equipment, as of January 1, 2021.	Acceptable				Acceptable	Unacceptable	Unacceptable in new equipment as of January 1, 2021.	Unacceptable in retrofit equipment as of July 20, 2016.Unacceptable in new equipment as of January 1, 2018	Unacceptable in retrofit equipment as of July 20, 2016. Unacceptable in new equipment as of January 1, 2017.			
R-422B		Acceptable	Unacceptable in new equipment, except as otherwise allowed under a narrowed use limit, as of January 1, 2024.	Unacceptable in new equipment, except as otherwise allowed under a narrowed use limit, as of January 1, 2024.	Acceptable	Unacceptable in new equipment as of January 1, 2023.	Acceptable	Unacceptable in new equipment, as of January 1, 2021.	Acceptable	Acceptable	Acceptable	Acceptable	Acceptable	Unacceptable	Unacceptable in new equipment as of January 1, 2021.	Acceptable	Acceptable		Acceptable	
R-422C			Unacceptable in new equipment, except as otherwise allowed under a narrowed use limit, as of January 1, 2024.	Unacceptable in new equipment, except as otherwise allowed under a narrowed use limit, as of January 1, 2024.	Acceptable	Unacceptable in new equipment as of January 1, 2023.	Acceptable	Unacceptable in new equipment, as of January 1, 2021.	Acceptable	Acceptable	Acceptable	Acceptable	Acceptable	Unacceptable	Unacceptable in new equipment as of January 1, 2021.	Unacceptable in retrofit equipment as of July 20, 2016.Unacceptable in new equipment as of January 1, 2018	Unacceptable in retrofit equipment as of July 20, 2016. Unacceptable in new equipment as of January 1, 2017.	Unacceptable in new equipment as of January 1, 2019	Acceptable	Acceptable
R-422D		Acceptable	Unacceptable in new equipment, except as otherwise allowed under a narrowed use limit, as of January 1, 2024.	Unacceptable in new equipment, except as otherwise allowed under a narrowed use limit, as of January 1, 2024.	Acceptable	Unacceptable in new equipment as of January 1, 2023.	Acceptable	Unacceptable in new equipment, as of January 1, 2021.	Acceptable	Acceptable	Acceptable	Acceptable	Acceptable	Unacceptable	Unacceptable in new equipment as of January 1, 2021.	Unacceptable in retrofit equipment as of July 20, 2016.Unacceptable in new equipment as of January 1, 2018	Unacceptable in retrofit equipment as of July 20, 2016. Unacceptable in new equipment as of January 1, 2017.	Unacceptable in new equipment as of January 1, 2019		Acceptable
R-423A			Unacceptable in new equipment, except as otherwise allowed under a narrowed use limit, as of January 1, 2024.		Acceptable	Unacceptable in new equipment as of January 1, 2023.			Acceptable	Acceptable										
R-424A		Acceptable	Unacceptable in new equipment, except as otherwise allowed under a narrowed use limit, as of January 1, 2024.	Unacceptable in new equipment, except as otherwise allowed under a narrowed use limit, as of January 1, 2024.	Acceptable	Unacceptable in new equipment as of January 1, 2023.	Acceptable	Unacceptable in new equipment, as of January 1, 2021.	Acceptable	Acceptable	Acceptable	Acceptable	Acceptable	Unacceptable	Unacceptable in new equipment as of January 1, 2021.	Acceptable	Acceptable			
R-426A	Unacceptable as of MY 2017.	Acceptable			Acceptable	Acceptable	Acceptable	Unacceptable in new equipment, as of January 1, 2021.	Acceptable	Acceptable		Acceptable	Acceptable	Unacceptable	Acceptable	Acceptable	Acceptable	Unacceptable in new equipment as of January 1, 2019		Acceptable
R-427A		Acceptable		Acceptable	Acceptable			Acceptable		Acceptable	Acceptable			Acceptable	Acceptable	Acceptable	Acceptable			
R-428A					Acceptable	Unacceptable in new equipment as of January 1, 2023.	Acceptable	Unacceptable in new equipment, as of January 1, 2021.	Acceptable				Acceptable	Unacceptable	Unacceptable in new equipment as of January 1, 2021.	Unacceptable in retrofit equipment as of July 20, 2016.Unacceptable in new equipment as of January 1, 2018	Unacceptable in retrofit equipment as of July 20, 2016. Unacceptable in new equipment as of January 1, 2017.			
R-434A		Acceptable	Unacceptable in new equipment, except as otherwise allowed under a narrowed use limit, as of January 1, 2024.	Unacceptable in new equipment, except as otherwise allowed under a narrowed use limit, as of January 1, 2024.	Acceptable	Unacceptable in new equipment as of January 1, 2023.	Acceptable	Unacceptable in new equipment, as of January 1, 2021.	Acceptable	Acceptable	Acceptable	Acceptable	Acceptable	Unacceptable	Unacceptable in new equipment as of January 1, 2021.	Unacceptable in retrofit equipment as of July 20, 2016.Unacceptable in new equipment as of January 1, 2018	Unacceptable in retrofit equipment as of July 20, 2016. Unacceptable in new equipment as of January 1, 2017.			Acceptable
R-437A				Unacceptable in new equipment, except as otherwise allowed under a narrowed use limit, as of January 1, 2024.	Acceptable	Acceptable	Acceptable	Unacceptable in new equipment, as of January 1, 2021.	Acceptable	Acceptable	Acceptable	Acceptable	Acceptable	Unacceptable	Unacceptable in new equipment as of January 1, 2021.	Acceptable	Acceptable	Unacceptable in new equipment as of January 1, 2019		Acceptable
R-438A		Acceptable	Unacceptable in new equipment, except as otherwise allowed under a narrowed use limit, as of January 1, 2024.	Unacceptable in new equipment, except as otherwise allowed under a narrowed use limit, as of January 1, 2024.	Acceptable	Unacceptable in new equipment as of January 1, 2023.	Acceptable	Unacceptable in new equipment, as of January 1, 2021.	Acceptable	Acceptable	Acceptable	Acceptable	Acceptable	Unacceptable	Unacceptable in new equipment as of January 1, 2021.	Acceptable	Acceptable	Unacceptable in new equipment as of January 1, 2019		Acceptable
R-441A								Acceptable with Use Conditions			Acceptable with Use Conditions: For use in self-contained room air conditioning			Acceptable with Use Conditions				Acceptable with Use Conditions		
R-442A							Acceptable		Acceptable							Acceptable	Acceptable			
R-443A			Unacceptable as of January 3, 2017.	Unacceptable as of January 3, 2017.		Unacceptable, as of January 3, 2017.					Unacceptable, as of January 3, 2017.									
R-448A					Acceptable	Acceptable	Acceptable		Acceptable				Acceptable	Acceptable: Low temperature Use	Acceptable	Acceptable	Acceptable			
R-449A					Acceptable	Acceptable	Acceptable		Acceptable				Acceptable	Acceptable: Low temperature Use	Acceptable	Acceptable	Acceptable			
R-449B					Acceptable	Acceptable	Acceptable		Acceptable				Acceptable	Acceptable: Low temperature Use	Acceptable	Acceptable	Acceptable			
R-450A			Acceptable	Acceptable	Acceptable	Acceptable	Acceptable	Acceptable	Acceptable	Acceptable			Acceptable	Acceptable	Acceptable	Acceptable	Acceptable	Acceptable		Acceptable
R-452A																Acceptable				
R-452B											Acceptable with Use Conditions		Acceptable: For use in refrigerated trucks and trailers only.							
R-452C													Acceptable: For use in refrigerated trucks and trailers only.			Acceptable				
R-453A					Acceptable	Acceptable							Acceptable: For use in refrigerated trucks and trailers only.			Acceptable				
R-454A											Acceptable with Use Conditions									
R-454B											Acceptable with Use Conditions									
R-454C											Acceptable with Use Conditions									
R-457A											Acceptable with Use Conditions									
R-458A					Acceptable						Acceptable					Acceptable				
R-507, R-507A			Unacceptable in new equipment, except as otherwise allowed under a narrowed use limit, as of January 1, 2024.	Unacceptable in new equipment, except as otherwise allowed under a narrowed use limit, as of January 1, 2024.	Acceptable	Unacceptable in new equipment as of January 1, 2023.	Acceptable	Unacceptable in new equipment, as of January 1, 2021.	Acceptable	Acceptable	Acceptable	Acceptable	Acceptable	Unacceptable	Unacceptable in new equipment as of January 1, 2021.	Unacceptable in retrofit equipment as of July 20, 2016.Unacceptable in new equipment as of January 1, 2018	Unacceptable in retrofit equipment as of July 20, 2016. Unacceptable in new equipment as of January 1, 2017.	Unacceptable in retrofit equipment as of July 20, 2016.Unacceptable in new equipment as of January 1, 2019.	Acceptable	Acceptable
R-508A					Acceptable														Acceptable	
R-508B					Acceptable														Acceptable	
R-513A			Acceptable	Acceptable	Acceptable	Acceptable	Acceptable	Acceptable	Acceptable	Acceptable		Acceptable	Acceptable	Acceptable with Use Conditions: Low temperature	Acceptable	Acceptable	Acceptable	Acceptable		Acceptable
R-515B			Acceptable	Acceptable						Acceptable										
R-600 (Butane)					Acceptable			Acceptable with Use Conditions						Acceptable with Use Conditions				Acceptable with Use Conditions		
R-744 (Carbon Dioxide, CO2)	Acceptable with Use Conditions		Acceptable	Acceptable	Acceptable	Acceptable			Acceptable	Acceptable			Acceptable	Acceptable	Acceptable	Acceptable	Acceptable	Acceptable	Acceptable	
RB-276	Unacceptable as of MY 2017.		Acceptable	Acceptable	Acceptable	Acceptable	Acceptable	Acceptable	Acceptable			Acceptable	Acceptable	Acceptable	Acceptable	Acceptable	Acceptable	Acceptable		Acceptable
RS-24 (2002 formulation)	Acceptable with Use Conditions	Acceptable			Acceptable	Acceptable	Acceptable	Unacceptable in new equipment, as of January 1, 2021.	Acceptable	Acceptable		Acceptable	Acceptable	Unacceptable	Acceptable	Acceptable	Acceptable	Unacceptable in new equipment as of January 1, 2019		Acceptable
RS-44 (2003 formulation)			Unacceptable in new equipment, except as otherwise allowed under a narrowed use limit, as of January 1, 2024.	Unacceptable in new equipment, except as otherwise allowed under a narrowed use limit, as of January 1, 2024.	Acceptable	Unacceptable in new equipment as of January 1, 2023.	Acceptable	Unacceptable in new equipment, as of January 1, 2021.	Acceptable	Acceptable	Acceptable	Acceptable	Acceptable	Unacceptable	Unacceptable in new equipment as of January 1, 2021.	Acceptable	Acceptable			
Self-chilling cans using CO2						Acceptable		Acceptable					Acceptable	Acceptable		Acceptable	Acceptable	Acceptable		
SP34E	Unacceptable as of MY 2017.	Acceptable		Unacceptable in new equipment, except as otherwise allowed under a narrowed use limit, as of January 1, 2024.	Acceptable	Acceptable		Unacceptable in new equipment, as of January 1, 2021.					Acceptable	Unacceptable	Acceptable	Acceptable	Acceptable	Unacceptable in new equipment as of January 1, 2019		Acceptable
Stirling Cycle	Acceptable	Acceptable	Acceptable	Acceptable	Acceptable	Acceptable	Acceptable						Acceptable					Acceptable		
THR-01								Acceptable												
THR-02			Acceptable	Acceptable	Acceptable	Acceptable	Acceptable	Acceptable		Acceptable			Acceptable	Acceptable	Acceptable	Acceptable	Acceptable	Acceptable		Acceptable
THR-03			Unacceptable, except as otherwise allowed under a narrowed use limit, as of January 1, 2024.	Unacceptable in new equipment, except as otherwise allowed under a narrowed use limit, as of January 1, 2024.	Acceptable	Acceptable	Acceptable	Unacceptable in new equipment, as of January 1, 2021.	Acceptable	Acceptable	Acceptable with Use Conditions: For use in residential window unit air conditioning.		Acceptable	Unacceptable	Acceptable	Acceptable	Acceptable			
THR-04					Acceptable	Acceptable	Acceptable	Acceptable	Acceptable				Acceptable	Acceptable	Acceptable	Acceptable	Acceptable	Acceptable		Acceptable
Trans-1-chloro-3,3,3-trifluoroprop-1-ene			Acceptable																	
Water / Lithium Bromide Absorption			Acceptable																	

== See also ==
- ASHRAE - Standards 15 and 34 are necessary part of most submittal processes to the program
- Clean Air Act - The act that established section 612
- EPA - The central regulatory agency in charge of operating the SNAP program
- Section 608 - Which helps enforce the chemicals listed as part of the program
- Title 40 of the Code of Federal Regulations
