= Section 608 =

Occupational Licensing Regulation for HVAC Technicians in the United States

Section 608 (together with Section 609, which covers motor vehicles) of the Clean Air Act serves as the main form of occupational licensure for technicians in the heating, ventilation, and air conditioning (HVAC) industry in the United States. The law requires that all persons who maintain, service, repair or dispose of appliances that contain regulated refrigerants be certified in proper refrigerant handling techniques. The regulatory program helps to minimize the release of refrigerants, and in particular ozone depleting refrigerants such as chlorofluorocarbons and hydrofluorocarbons, as well as other regulated refrigerants as determined by Section 612. The licensure program complies with the requirements under the Montreal Protocol. The Environmental Protection Agency (EPA) published implementing regulations at 40 CFR Part 82.

== Scope ==
There are four categories of certification:

Type	Application
I	Persons who maintain, service or repair small appliances with less than 5 lbs of refrigerant.
II	Persons who maintain, service, repair or dispose of high pressure appliances, except for small appliances.
III	Persons who maintain, service, repair, or dispose of low pressure appliances.
Universal	Persons who maintain, service, repair, or dispose of any appliance in categories of types I, II, or III.

A technician with the required level of certification may also legally purchase regulated refrigerants. Technicians who violate the Clean Air Act provisions may be fined, lose their certification, and may be required to appear in Federal court. As of January 8, 2025, the maximum civil penalty for a Clean Air Act violation, including the knowing venting of regulated refrigerants prohibited under Section 608, is $124,426 per day per violation, an amount the EPA adjusts annually for inflation.

== Provisions ==
In general, along with general enforcement provisions, section 608 manages the following regulatory requirements:

- Technician certification
- Refrigerant recovery and recycling techniques and procedures
- Leak checking
- Sales restrictions and venting prohibitions - Listing of chemicals that fall under these requirements is part of the Significant New Alternatives Policy program
- Record keeping requirements
- Disposal and safety
- Reclamation
- Service practices.

=== Recovery level ===
For Type I systems the main requirement is to remove 80% of the refrigerant if the appliance's compressor is not running and 90% if running and evacuate to a 4 inch Hg vacuum.

For Type II or Type III applications, the appliance must be evacuated to the following levels for device manufactured after November 15, 1993 in order to recover the refrigerant

Application	Required Evacuation
Very high pressure	0"Hg
High pressure w/<200 lbs of refrigerant	0"Hg
High pressure w/>=200 lbs of refrigerant	10"Hg
Medium pressure w/<200 lbs of refrigerant	10"Hg
Medium pressure w/>=200 lbs of refrigerant	15"Hg
Low pressure (Type III)	25mm Hg absolute

Where pressure classification of the refrigerant is defined by the refrigerant's pressure at 104F as

Type	Pressure
Very High Pressure	Above 355 psia
High Pressure	Between 170 and 355 psia
Medium Pressure	Between 45 psia and 170 psia
Low Pressure	Below 45 psia

=== Recording Requirements ===
For systems containing 50 lbs or more of refrigerant, for each service, the owner must be supplied with information of:

- Date of service
- Type of service
- Type of refrigerant purchased
- Quantity of refrigerant added

And such records must be held for 3 years.

Additionally, if an appliance leaks more than 125% of refrigerant, it must be reported to the EPA.

=== Leak Repair Requirements ===
Leaks must be repaired in systems with greater than 50 lbs of refrigerant if the leak rate exceeds

Application	Annual Leak Rate %
Industrial Process Refrigeration	30%
Commercial Refrigeration	20%
Comfort/Residential Cooling	10%

In which case, they must be repaired within 30 days/120 if industrial process shutdown is required. An initial verification test must then be done within 30/120 days, and then a follow-up test within 10 days of that. There are additional clauses for extensions if needed.

If the leak is not to be repaired, there must be a plan to retire or retrofit the appliance within 30 days, to be completed within one year.

If more than a year is required, a report must be submitted, which must include:

- Estimated date(s) of completion
- The type of process
- The leak rate
- Method to determine the leak
- Full unit charge
- Date of discovery
- Location of leaks
- Repair work
- Plan for retrofitting or retiring the system
- Why more than one year is necessary
- Date of notification to the EPA

=== Leak Inspection Regulations ===
Additional leak inspection frequencies following a leak must regard the following until the leak rate is within acceptable levels:

System Size	Application	Frequency
>=500lbs	Industrial Process and Commercial Refrigeration	Every 3 months for a year.
<500 lbs and >=50lbs	Industrial Process and Commercial Refrigeration	Annually
--	Comfort/Residential Cooling	Annually

These leak inspections may be bypassed if the system is installed with an automatic leak detection system.

== Credentialing and exams ==
Apprenticeship offices in the United States

EPA regulations require the test to be a "closed book" proctored exam. The only outside materials allowed are a temperature / pressure chart, scratch paper and a calculator. The certification exam contains 4 sections: Core, Type I, Type II, and Type III. Each section contains 25 multiple choice questions. The technician must achieve a passing score of 70% in each Type in which they are to be certified. All technicians must pass the CORE section before receiving any certification. A technician seeking certification must correctly answer 18 out of 25 questions on the CORE and at least one other section of the exam. A technician seeking Universal certification must correctly answer 18 out of 25 questions on each section of the exam.

In addition to covering EPA (in particular, Section 608) regulations, the exam also covers basic safety and occupational practices, along with fundamental concepts of stratospheric ozone protection (which are typically part of the Core exam).

Many universities and colleges also have associate degrees and apprenticeship programs that teach HVAC fundamentals along with providing EPA examinations.

== See also ==
- Air Conditioning, Heating and Refrigeration Institute - In particular, standard 700 helps define levels of refrigerant reclamation, and standard 740 defines standards for recovery equipment
- ASHRAE - In particular, standard 15 helps define refrigerant safety groups
- HVAC Technical Standards Organizations
- Occupational licensure
- Ozone depletion
- Refrigerant reclamation
- Significant New Alternatives Policy
