= World Refrigeration Day =

Annual international event on June 26

- World Refrigeration Day logo
- Date: 26 June
- Frequency: Annual
- Location: Worldwide
- Inaugurated: 26 June 2019
- Founder: Stephen Gill
- Organiser: World Refrigeration Day Secretariat
- Website: worldrefrigerationday.org

World Refrigeration Day is an international day established by the World Refrigeration Day Secretariat in Derbyshire, England. Held annually on 26 June, it was created to raise awareness about the importance of refrigeration technologies in everyday life and to raise the profile of the refrigeration, air-conditioning and heat-pump sector. The day was chosen to celebrate the birth date of Lord Kelvin on 26 June 1824.

== History ==
World Refrigeration Day was the idea of refrigeration consultant Stephen Gill, former president of the Institute of Refrigeration in the UK. In October 2018, ASHRAE (The American Society of Heating, Refrigerating and Air-Conditioning Engineers) pledged support for World Refrigeration Day. In January 2019, ASHRAE awarded Gill its John F James International Award in Atlanta. In February 2019, the United Nations Environment Programme pledged support at the UNEP national ozone officers meeting in Paris. The inaugural World Refrigeration Day was held on 26 June 2019.

== Annual themes ==
- 2019 - Diversity; diversity of applications, people, careers, locations, technology, science, engineered solutions, and innovation.
- 2020 - The Cold Chain; role of the Cold chain sector in food safety and security, and human health.
- 2021 - Careers; aimed at students and young professionals.
- 2022 - Cooling Matters; raise awareness of the benefits and impacts of cooling, and technology solutions for sustainability.
- 2023 - Next Generation Cooling; highlighting innovative technologies that improve energy efficiency and promote sustainable practices going into the future.
- 2024 - Temperature Matters; highlighting the significance of temperature control in daily life.
