= Refrigerant reclamation =

Recycling of refrigerant gas

Refrigerant reclamation is the act of processing used refrigerant gas which has previously been used in some type of refrigeration loop to meet the specifications for new refrigerant gas. In the United States, the Section 608 of the Clean Air Act of 1990 requires that used refrigerant be processed by a certified reclaimer, which must be licensed by the United States Environmental Protection Agency (EPA), and the material must be recovered and delivered to the reclaimer by EPA-certified technicians.

== Background ==
Coolant and refrigerants are found throughout the industrialized world, in homes, offices, and factories, in devices such as refrigerators, air conditioners, central air conditioning systems (HVAC), freezers, and dehumidifiers. When these units are serviced, there is a risk that refrigerant gas will be vented into the atmosphere, hence the creation of technician training and certification programs in order to ensure that the material is conserved and managed safely. Mistreatment of these gases has been shown to deplete the ozone layer and is suspected to contribute to global warming.

Reclamation of used refrigerant by an EPA-certified reclaimer is required in order to sell used refrigerant not originating from and intended for use with motor vehicle air conditioners and stationary equipment like air conditioners, refrigerators, central air conditioning systems (HVAC), and other cooling equipment. The EPA implemented a Code of Federal Regulations in 1995 in order to develop actions to meet the agreements defined in the Montreal Protocol.

Reclamation, as it refers to refrigerants, is one of three components in a refrigerant management process.

The EPA defines refrigerant reclamation as "Reclaim refrigerant means to reprocess refrigerant to at least the purity specified in appendix A to 40 CFR part 82, subpart F (based on AHRI Standard 700–1993, Specifications for Fluorocarbon and Other Refrigerants) and to verify this purity using the analytical methodology prescribed in appendix A. In general, reclamation involves the use of processes or procedures available only at a reprocessing or manufacturing facility."

EPA establishes rules and regulations that reclaimers must acknowledge, and they license these reclaimers to operate. In most cases wholesale distributors provide this service as an intermediary, since they have such great resources to manage distribution.

The EPA requires that refrigerant be reclaimed when a certified technician recovers refrigerant and puts it in a special DoT container and has no intention of putting it back in the same system from which it was recovered.

== Certification program ==
The final rule published on May 14, 1993, requires that refrigerant sold to a new owner be reclaimed to the AHRI Standard 700 of purity by a certified reclaimer (Sec. 82.154(g) and (h) referencing standard in Sec. 82.164 and the definition of reclaim found in Sec. 82.152). As discussed in the final rule, this requirement protects the purity of used refrigerant to prevent damage to air-conditioning and refrigeration equipment from the use of contaminated refrigerant. Equipment damage from contaminated refrigerant would result in costs to equipment owners, in releases of refrigerant from damaged equipment through increased leakage, servicing and replacement, and in reduction in consumer confidence in the quality of used refrigerant. This reduction in consumer confidence could lead to the premature retirement or retrofit of CFC or HCFC equipment since consumers would no longer believe that a sufficient stock of trustworthy refrigerants was available.

AHRI develops standards and manages third party testing and certification programs. AHRI oversees the ARI reclaimer program: Refrigerant Testing Laboratory Certification Find ARI Performance Certified Refrigerant Testing Laboratory Certification.

The certification program includes verification for all participating refrigerant testing laboratories, performing ARI-700 testing on any new or reclaimed refrigerants.

== Certified ratings ==
AHRI also works with many participants in the industry to ensure that the standards that reclaimers are expected to achieve are well defined and support the highest level of integrity so technicians can be confident in the materials they are using and installing.

Before reclamation can begin the material must be recovered and the EPA defines that as "Recover refrigerant means to remove refrigerant in any condition from an appliance and to store it in an external container without necessarily testing or processing it in any way."

Some circumstances where the material is being put back into the system it was removed and not being transferred to a new system the material can be recycled and the EPA defines that as "Recycle refrigerant means to extract refrigerant from an appliance and clean refrigerant for reuse without meeting all of the requirements for reclamation. In general, recycled refrigerant is refrigerant that is cleaned using oil separation and single or multiple passes through devices, such as replaceable core filter-driers, which reduce moisture, acidity, and particulate matter. These procedures are usually implemented at the field job site."

== See also ==
- AHRI
- List of refrigerants
- Section 608
