= Air Conditioning, Heating and Refrigeration Institute =

North American trade association

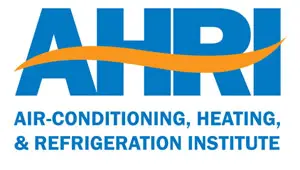
AHRI Logo

The Air Conditioning, Heating, and Refrigeration Institute (AHRI), formed in 2008 by a merger of the Air-Conditioning and Refrigeration Institute (ARI) and the Gas Appliance Manufacturers Association (GAMA), is a North American trade association of manufacturers of air conditioning, heating, and commercial refrigeration equipment.

== Advocacy ==
The organization performs political advocacy on behalf of its member industries, maintains technical standards, certifies products, shares data, conducts research, and awards scholarships.

It also has a research arm, the Air-Conditioning, Heating and Refrigeration Technology Institute (AHRTI).

== Annual meeting ==
AHRI's 2017 annual meeting was held at Trump National Doral Miami. AHRI paid Trump Doral $700,650 for the event. Two weeks later, the Trump administration announced support for the Kigali Accord to the Montreal Protocol, a move that was lobbied for and celebrated by AHRI.

== See also ==
- AHRI Standard 700
