= Edward Hallstrom =

Australian philanthropist and businessman

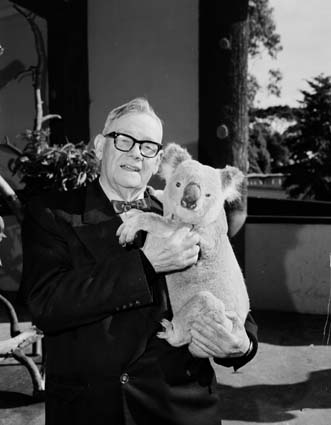
Edward Hallstrom holding a koala at Taronga Zoo, in 1964

Sir Edward John Lees Hallstrom (25 September 1886 – 27 February 1970) was one of Australia's best-known philanthropists and businessmen of the mid-20th century. Hallstrom is best known for his long association with the Taronga Zoo and for his "Silent Knight" brand of refrigerators.

== Early life and family background ==
Born at High Park station, near Coonamble, New South Wales, Hallstrom was the eighth of a family of nine children born to William Hallstrom, a saddler from England of Swedish extraction, and his Australian wife Mary Ann (née Colless).

The accepted biographical narrative is that, at the age of four, his father's farm failed and the family moved to Waterloo, an inner-city suburb of Sydney. The actual events before the move were complicated. In 1888, Hallstrom's father had sued a neighbour concerning damage caused by a dam on the neighbour's property. Not long before he won £500 in damages, a suspicious fire destroyed a shed on his property, containing uninsured grains and goods, said to be worth over £300. In February 1890, his father was arrested, after another fire that caused damage to insured property worth £500—another man's shed containing property belonging to William Hallstrom—was found to be willfully caused. Charged with arson, he was acquitted at trial, in March 1890, after one of the witnesses against him had admitted to perjury. Soon after his acquittal for arson, William Hallstrom was arrested and committed for trial, on a charge of subornation of perjury. The charges were probably dropped, as there seems to have been no trial. By early April 1890, William Hallstrom was selling off his farm horses.

Not long afterwards, the family moved to Sydney, settling at Waterloo. There, Hallstrom formed a friendship with the young William McKell, whose early life and family circumstances have some striking similarities to Hallstrom's own. McKell became first a boilermaker and was involved in the Labour Movement, later studied law and became a barrister, entered politics and was later a Premier of New South Wales, and eventually became Governor-General of Australia. Although Hallstrom himself would never be a supporter of the Australian Labor Party, their friendship was lifelong.

Hallstrom's parents separated—actually his father, William Hallstrom, seems to have deserted the family—and, by the age of 10, Hallstrom was working, performing a variety of jobs to help supplement the family's income, as were his siblings. Hallstrom never spoke of his father, but did have memories of difficult times and the struggle to keep the farm.

Largely self-taught and having left school at thirteen, Hallstrom applied himself well to both his studies and his work. Hallstrom is said to have taught himself by reading books, including the English publication, Harmsworth Self-Educator, a copy of which he kept until his death. Hallstrom was apprenticed, as a cabinet maker and eventually took charge of a furniture factory. Hallstrom later founded a business of his own, manufacturing bedsteads.

He was of a Methodist background. John and Mary Lees, pioneers of the Methodist denomination in Australia, were ancestors on his mother's side. Hallstrom was a lifelong teetotaller, and neither smoked nor gambled.

== Early flying ==
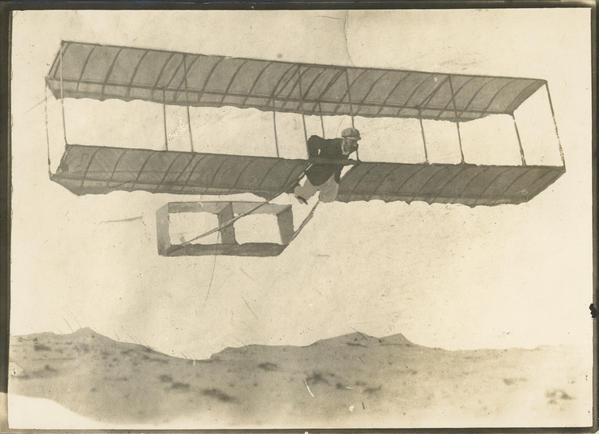
Taylor and his glider, 1909

Hallstrom was a member of the Australian Aerial League, led by George Augustine Taylor. Beginning on 5 December 1909, at the sand hills near the entrance to Narrabeen Lakes, he took turns—along with Taylor, Taylor's wife Florence Mary Taylor, and two others—to make short non-powered flights, in a glider that Taylor had built, based upon the box-kite designs of Taylor's close friend, Lawrence Hargraves. It was intended that the glider would be fitted with an engine to become the first Australian-made aeroplane, but the engine was not delivered, and that honour went instead to John Duigan.

The flights on 5 December 1909 are regarded as the first flights of a heavier-than-air aircraft in Australia, and are commemorated by three replicas of Taylor's glider, one of which is in the collection of the National Museum of Australia.

== Family ==
Hallstrom met his first wife, Margaret Elliott Jaffrey, on a trip to Queensland. She was a talented artist, and shared his enthusiasm for birds and animals. They were married at her parents' home in the Brisbane suburb of New Farm, on 6 April 1912. After their reception, the newly weds left for Sydney on RMS Osterley. The couple had one son and three daughters.

== Bedstead manufacturer ==
Hallstrom's business, in Abattoir Road, Pyrmont—set up by late 1920 and possibly as early as late 1918—flourished initially. Hallstrom claimed to have made the first innerspring mattresses in Australia.

Hallstrom set up a sawmill to mill his own hardwood timber, at Micalong (near Tumut), in 1921, reportedly at a cost of £3,500. The sawmill was sold to others in mid 1922, after being idle for several months. The costly, short-lived expansion into saw milling probably had put Hallstrom's privately owned business under some financial strain. Hallstrom registered a public company, E. J. L. Hallstrom Ltd, in November 1923, with capital of £10,000 in £1 shares, to acquire the business in November 1923, although it is likely that Hallstrom, or his family, owned most if not all of the new shares.

The never properly explained death of one of his wire-mattress makers, at the Pyrmont factory, in July 1923, both attracted nationwide attention and litigation that eventually reached the High Court, which directed the matter to arbitration under the Workmen's Compensation Act. The arbitration confirmed an award of £500 to the widow, in 1925, and that, with legal costs, crippled the business financially. E. J. L. Hallstrom Ltd, which had by then moved to Moore Street, Leichhardt, was voluntarily wound up in early 1926. Hallstrom was made bankrupt in February 1926. It seemed as if Hallstrom's business career was at an early end.

== Eight difficult years ==
While Hallstrom bedstead business prospered, Hallstrom and his family had been living in the suburb of Roseville, and he was well off enough to own a motor car. The financial difficulties that followed were described as "eight difficult years" by his daughter Esme. During that time, Hallstrom became bankrupt, the life of relative prosperity ended, and the family moved often; first to Balgowlah, and then to Gore Hill, Dee Why, and Willoughby.

Esme says that the family fortunes began to improve once Hallstrom was employed at the same factory, in Redfern, where he had worked as a foreman before commencing his own bedstead business. He had been sought out by his former employer, when he heard that Hallstrom was in difficulty. In 1915, Hallstrom had been named as the inventor on a patent, but the patent had been assigned in the name of one Louis Joseph, a manufacturer of bedding, who had a bedding factory in Shepherd Street, Redfern; it is almost certain that he was Hallstrom's benefactor in difficult times. Hallstrom was said to have remained grateful to him, for the rest of his days, something that may have influenced his own later philanthropy.

The business also manufactured wooden cabinets of ice chests, something that stimulated Hallstrom's interest in refrigeration. While working at the factory, he developed an insulated wooden ice chest design, with a top-access door, that would reappear in his earliest refrigerators.

The difficult years ended around 1932, when Hallstrom was released from bankruptcy, having already begun small-scale manufacturing of refrigerators around 1930. He was able to purchase both the building that became his factory and Figtree House at Northbridge, which would become his home. Although it was on a large block of waterfront land, the house, built in 1875, was old and isolated, located in an area yet to be developed, and without a water, gas or electricity supply.

== Inventor ==
Initially, refrigeration was not the only area to catch Hallstrom's interest; he dabbled in aviation and claimed to have invented a new type of shell to strike ships below the waterline. His first three Australian patents, in 1913, 1915, and 1926, were to do with the design of beds. However, it was his interest in refrigeration that would have the most tangible results. Self taught, he read up on the subject, including reading every patent on refrigeration taken out since Federation.

During the 1920s, electric refrigerators were available, but were expensive and so relatively uncommon. In towns, iceboxes, also called ice chests in Australia, were common but required home deliveries of blocks of ice, at intervals dictated by the weather conditions. Residents of rural areas, remote or yet to be electrified, had little choice other than the Coolgardie safe, an evaporative cooler of limited effectiveness. An affordable and effective refrigeration solution for the rural parts of the country was needed, and presented a great business opportunity.

Various sources state that Hallstrom invented his Icy Ball refrigeration device in 1923. However, there is a problem with that early date; there is concurrence that the invention took place in the backyard shed of his home at Dee Why, but in 1923 Hallstrom was not yet living at Dee Why. Hallstrom's daughter Esme put the year as both 1926 and 1927, in her account of the family. She also states that John (born 1915), although in his teens, learned the skill of oxy-welding to assist his father's work. Later an accomplished artist herself, Esme made a sketch of the family with the refrigeration apparatus, presumably from memory, which accurately rendered a device quite similar to that later patented by Hallstrom—heated by what appears to be a Primus stove—and she described its operation in a way that is like that of an Icy Ball. His biographer, Audrey Tate, gives the year of the manufacture of his first refrigeration device as 1928.

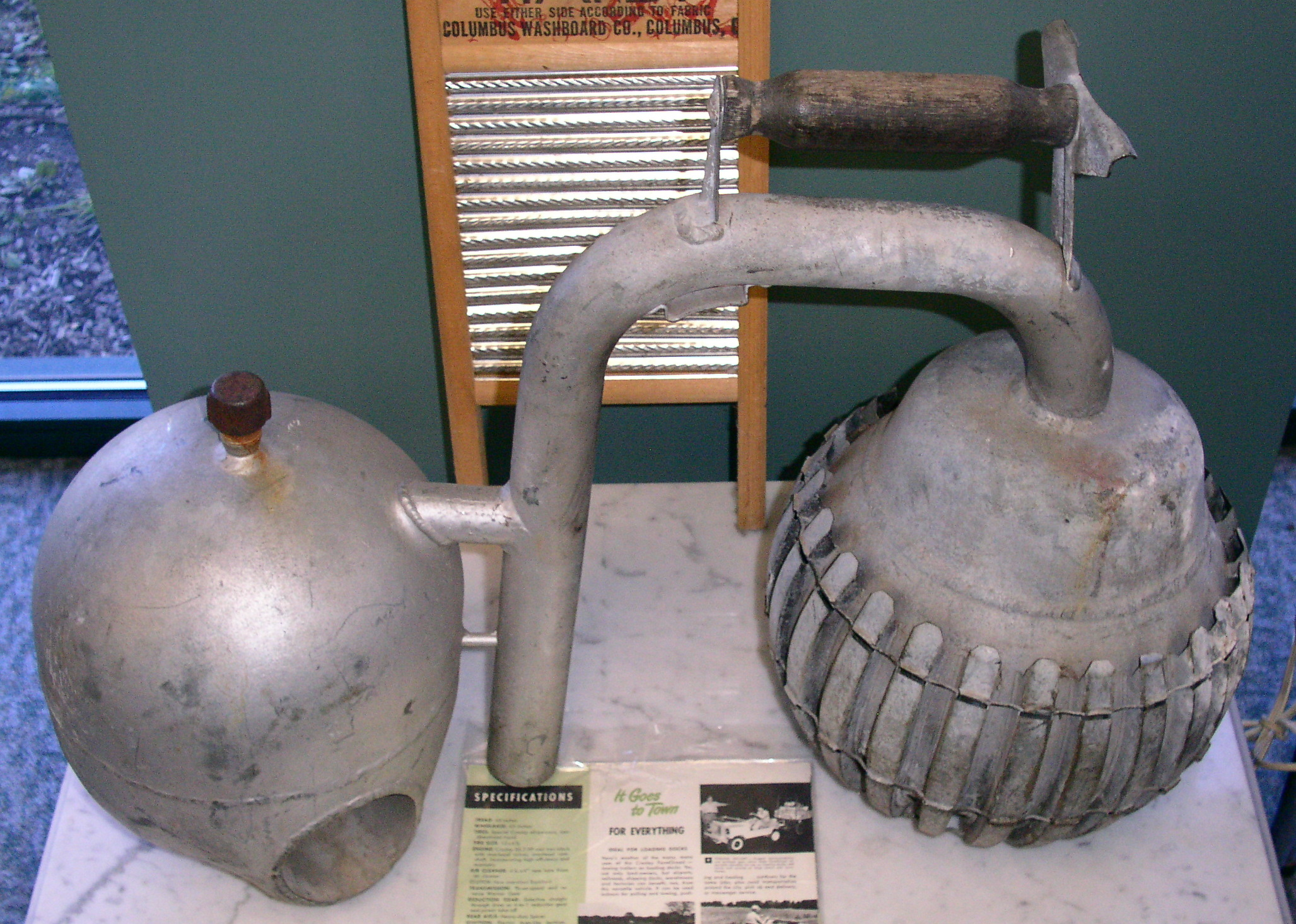
Crosley Icy Ball that was mass-produced in the U.S.A. Like Hallstrom's device, it was necessary to remove the device to recharge it.

Another kerosene-powered refrigerating device, also called an Icy Ball, was invented by Canadian engineer, David Forbes Keith. Keith had filed two Canadian patent applications relating to absorption refrigeration, in 1921 and 1922. Later, while consulting to the Crosley Radio Corp, he reused concepts from his earlier patents to design the Icy Ball. After Keith filed for a U.S. patent (1,740,737), on 27 June 1927, it was mass-produced in the United States by Powel Crosley Jr., but the US patent was only granted on 24 December 1929. It was being sold in Australia, by December 1927.

Yet another early, imported, kerosene-powered refrigeration device was the "Gnome ice producer"—its original German brand name was "Gnom"—which was on sale in Australia, by June 1926, even before the Crosley Icy Ball U.S. patent had been filed. Essentially, its operating procedure was the same as an Icy Ball. From around late 1927—possibly as early as June 1926—a more advanced kerosene-powered model, with an upright cabinet, referred to as a "Gnome refrigerator" was on sale, until at least 1931; its semi-automatic operating procedure was similar to Hallstrom's later 1934 model.

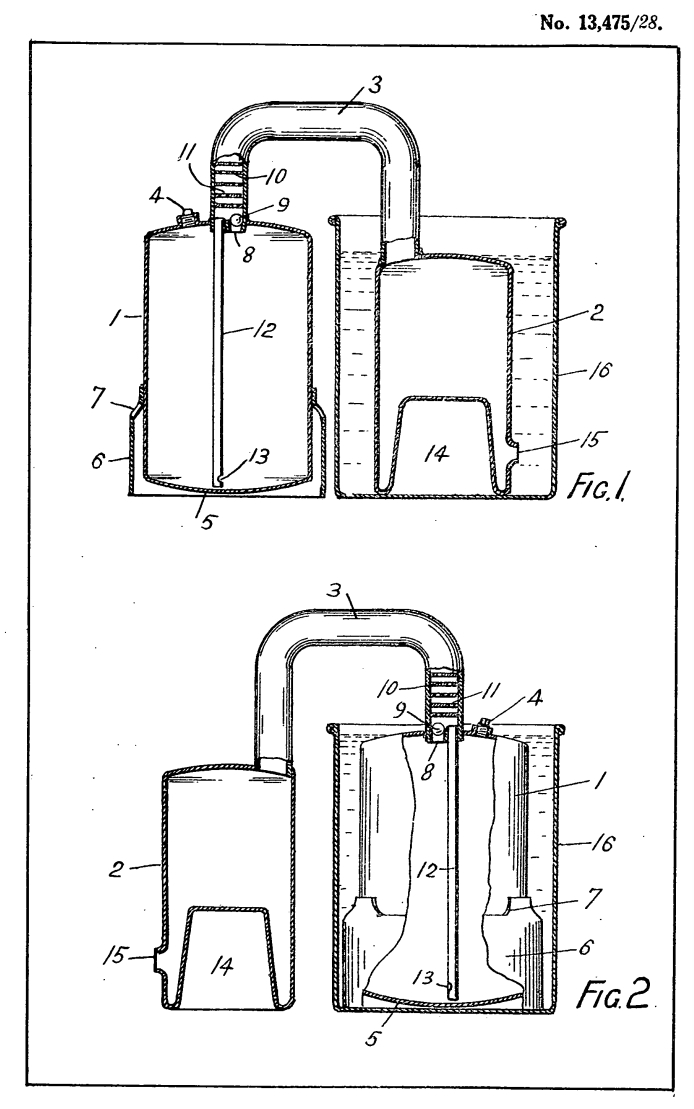
Hallstrom's first refrigeration device, patented in 1928

The Hallstrom and Crosley Icy Balls—almost certainly, the "Gnome ice producer" too—appear to have operated on similar principles; both consisted of two connected vessels that acted as a boiler/generator and condenser/evaporator, both used a mixture of ammonia and water as the refrigeration medium, and all three devices were operated using essentially the same manual recharging procedure. However, the shapes of the vessels of the two designs were quite different, and their similarities otherwise, quite probably, resulted from independent inventors attempting to solve exactly the same problem.

In May 1928, with Hallstrom still bankrupt and therefore using his wife's name, M. E. Hallstrom, a patent application, 13,475, "Improvements in refrigerating apparatus" was made, covering his refrigeration invention. This was followed by five more patent applications, all successful, which, after his release from bankruptcy in 1932, were made under his own name, in 1934, 1935, two in 1936, and 1940. He registered the design of his refrigerator (Registered design No. 12092), in 1934, the same year that his new refrigerator factory in Willoughby opened. His last patent was in 1951.

As Hallstrom became more prominent, he cultivated a public reputation as an inventor and engineer, a perception that contributed to his commercial success in selling refrigerators.

== Refrigerator manufacturer ==
=== White Frost ===
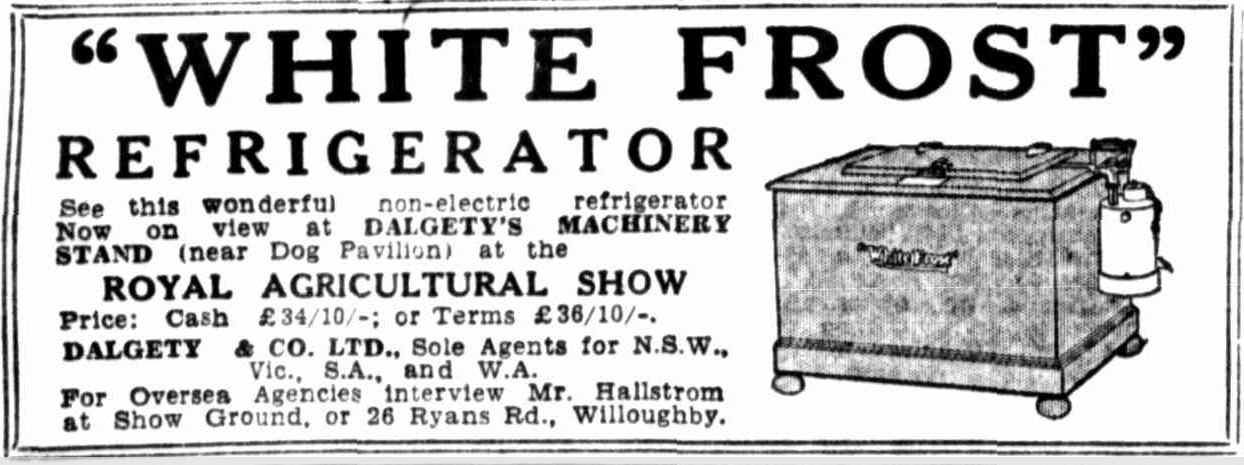
"White Frost" refrigerator, probably Hallstrom's first commercially-available product, made from around July 1930. Note the externally-mounted boiler/generator, which needed to be heated once per day using a kerosene burner, and the handle provided to lift the entire rechargeable refrigeration device out of the chest-style cabinet for recharging.

Hallstrom's Icy Ball was a kerosene-powered chest model, which he designed for use in the Australian outback, where the low-tech Coolgardie safe was in widespread use. He initially went to the outback to sell these units himself. In July 1928, the Crosley Radio Corporation took out an Australian trademark on the word "Icyball", meaning that Hallstrom could not use that branding. Hallstrom used the brand name "White Frost" also the name of a well-known American brand of domestic ice chest. However, his design was by then protected by patent.

The backyard shed of the Hallstrom's home at 26 Ryan Street (now Artarmon Road), Willoughby, was the location of his first manufacturing of refrigeration equipment. In March 1932, a refrigerator, known as the "White Frost", combining a removable, rechargeable refrigeration device and a top-entry insulated chest, was advertised as being on display at the 1932 Royal Easter Show, or at 26 Ryan Street. The "White Frost" was being advertised, by July 1930, for sale via the rural agency Dalgety & Company, and presumably Hallstrom's fledgling manufacturing operation was underway by then.

=== Factory ===
Hallstrom was an unlikely beneficiary of a new tax on fares of privately owned buses operating along tram routes, imposed in November 1931. Intended to stem losses due to bus competition with the government-owned tramways. It put some bus operators out of business and caused others to greatly scale back their operations to remain profitable. The White Transit Company's large bus depot building in Willoughby Road, Willoughby, close to where Hallstrom was living, was left unoccupied, after it was forced to abandon most of its services in the area. In 1932, Hallstrom bought the land and the building that would become the first building of his factory, which was later expanded to occupy adjacent land. The trams that ran right past its entrance made it easily accessible for his new workforce.

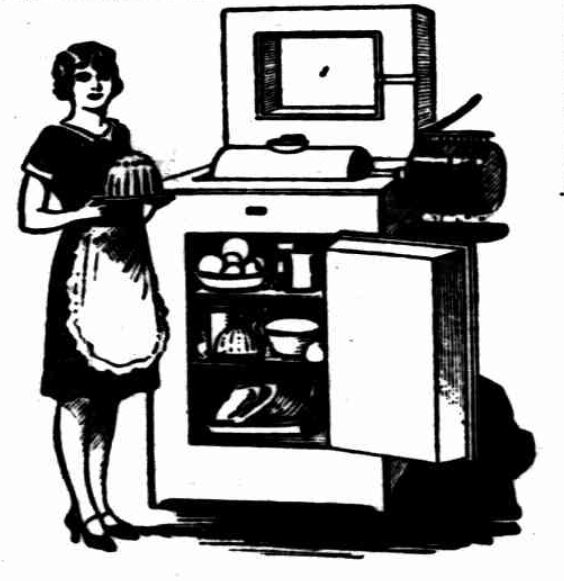
German-made, kerosene-powered, "Gnom" absorption refrigerator (1928). It was sold as "Gnome" in Australia.

=== Domestic market and import protection ===
Australia's population in 1928 was only 6.3 million, and its growth slowed dramatically with the onset of the Great Depression. After Federation, the Commonwealth government had protected Australian-manufactured goods from import competition. The tariff on refrigerators was 75%, or under the system of Imperial Preference, 55% if made in one of the participating countries of the British Empire. Such a large tariff that sheltered local refrigerator manufacturers from import competition worked both for and against him; it protected local manufacturers, like Hallstrom, but also encouraged large foreign firms to set up local manufacturing or assembly operations in Australia. The large American manufacturer Kelvinator commenced local assembly of its electric refrigerators in 1935. However, Hallstrom had the further advantage of having a niche market sector, in rural areas, then largely without electricity.

=== Mass production ===
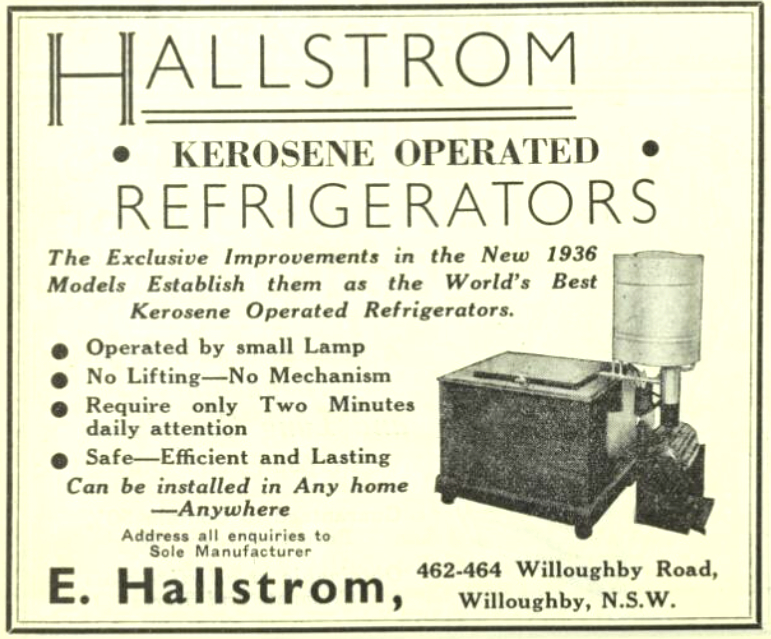
Advertisement showing improved chest model refrigerator of 1936. The cylindrical object, at top right in the photograph, is a water-filled tank, in which the condenser was immersed.

In 1934, Hallstrom introduced a refrigerator design—based on his patent 16,396/34 of the same year—that was more sophisticated than the "icy ball" concept. It had a separate condenser and evaporator, rather than the combined condenser/evaporator used in the "icy ball" approach, and was semi-automatic in operation. It was this 1934 design that was first manufactured in large numbers. Initially, it too was marketed as "White Frost", but soon just became "Hallstrom".

Hallstrom's factory also manufactured its refrigerators under other brand names, probably differentiated to suit different distributors of its products. The refrigerators Hallstrom manufactured at the Willoughby factory could also appear under the brand names Sno-man, Gulbransen, Magicold, Selfreezer, Freeze, Super-Freezer, Hollingsworth, and others. Separate advertisements, for the same product, using different brand names, could appear together. It was an early instance of an approach that later became known as "badge engineering".

By the later mid 1930s, Hallstrom's refrigerators, chest models with an external refrigeration unit and effective rather than aesthetically pleasing, suffered increasing competition from upright models that took up less floor area and had more features and a more attractive appearance. Hallstrom argued that the chest design was better than an upright design, for technical reasons, but the refrigerator market now demanded upright models. Hallstrom responded by also manufacturing an upright model refrigerator, from 1936, and improving his chest model refrigerators.

However, a major design deficiency that Hallstrom had to contend with was that his refrigerator designs relied upon water cooling. His 1936 "De Luxe" upright refrigerator still had the bulky water-filled tank, containing its immersed condenser, atop its cabinet.

=== Electrolux patents ===
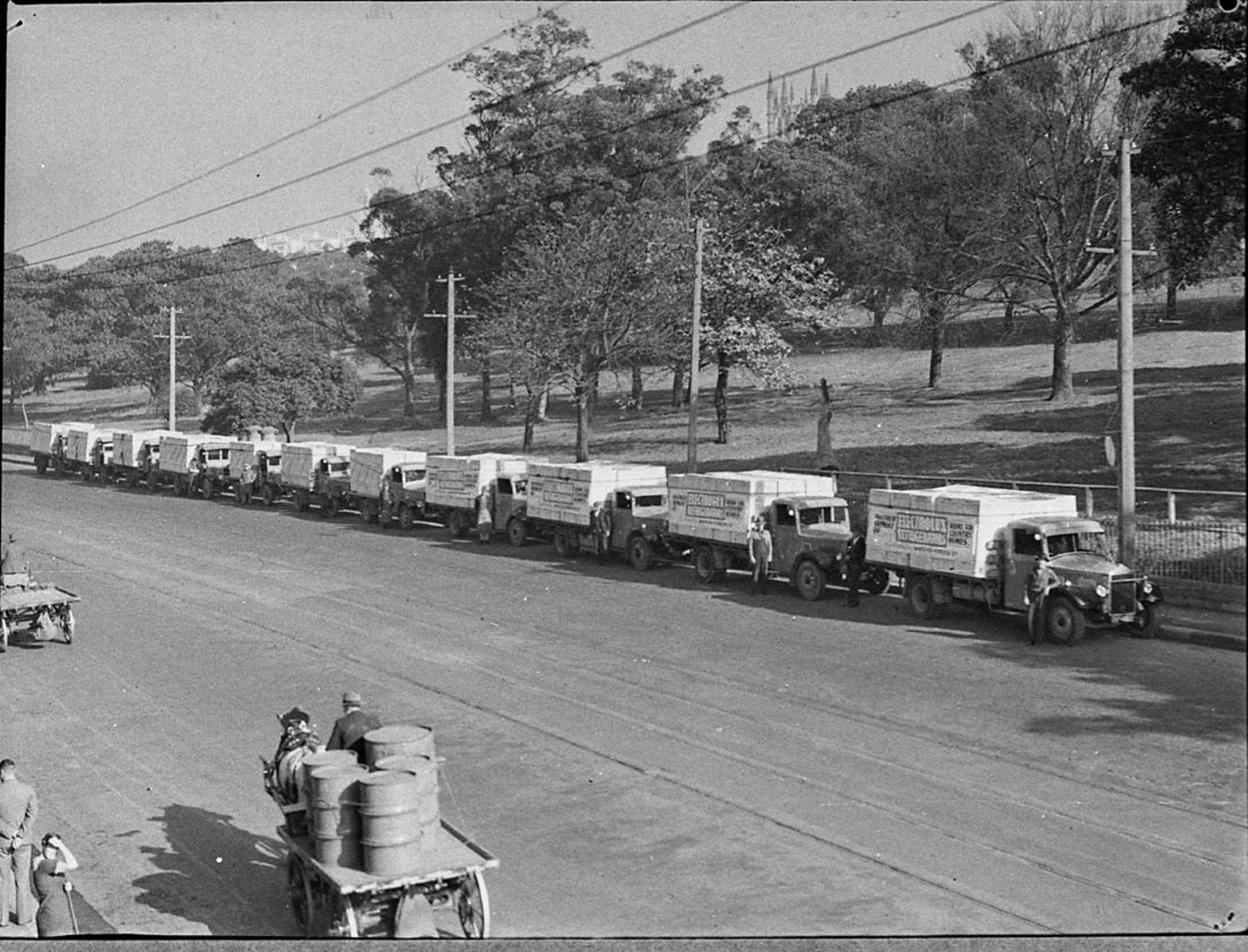
Eleven truck loads of Electrolux refrigerators, Sydney 1937. The advertising on the trucks reads, "Another shipment of Electrolux Refrigerators bound for country homes"

Electrolux was a large multinational appliance manufacturer, of Swedish origin and controlled by Axel Wenner-Gren, which made absorption refrigerators generally regarded as superior to Hallstrom's. Its designs were based on a groundbreaking 1922 invention, by Baltzar von Platen and Carl Munters, and used air cooling from 1931. Around 1927, Electrolux had entered the Australian market, selling upright refrigerators made at its factory in Luton, England.

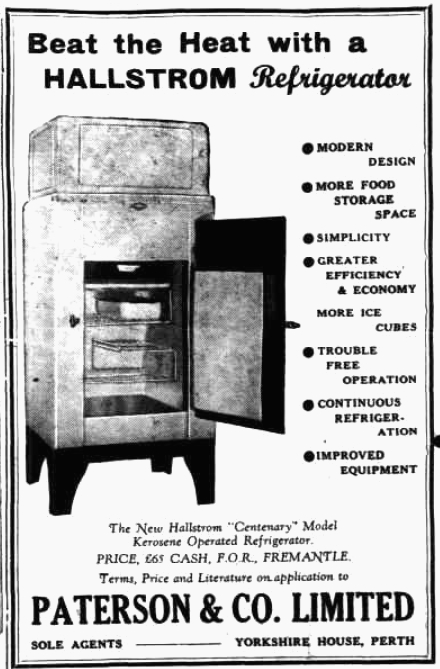
Hallstrom's 1938 model with brine tank

Electrolux was a major competitor, with Hallstrom's factory, in the market segment of kerosene-powered refrigerators for rural customers. Its Australian presence became more firmly entrenched, once it commenced manufacturing vacuum cleaners, in Melbourne, in 1936.

Two key Australian patents held by Electrolux, covering its successful, continuously freezing, air-cooled design, were due to expire on 18 August 1938. Hallstrom had prepared his factory to make use of design aspects covered by the expiring patents. However, on 29 December 1938, Electrolux petitioned to extend its patents, for another ten years; they had already begun to manufacture their refrigerators in Melbourne.

Hallstrom had new models planned for 1938-1939, but it eventuated that his 1938 "Centenary" upright model—somewhat more aesthetically pleasing than the 1936 model—still had a large, if better-disguised, tank filled with brine on top.

Hallstrom and another local manufacturer opposed the petition, and it was subsequently dismissed, on 28 March 1940. Once the Electrolux petition was dismissed, Hallstrom was free to apply the technology covered by the expired Electrolux patents, including an air-cooled design, to his new models for 1940.

=== Silent Knight ===
Hallstrom renewed his product line with the development of the popular "Silent Knight" upright refrigerator. These were absorption refrigerators, without any moving parts, obtained the necessary heat to drive the refrigeration process from either a kerosene or town gas burner or from an electric element. As the first of Hallstrom's refrigerators to use air cooling, the new model had a more aesthetically-pleasing and contemporary appearance.

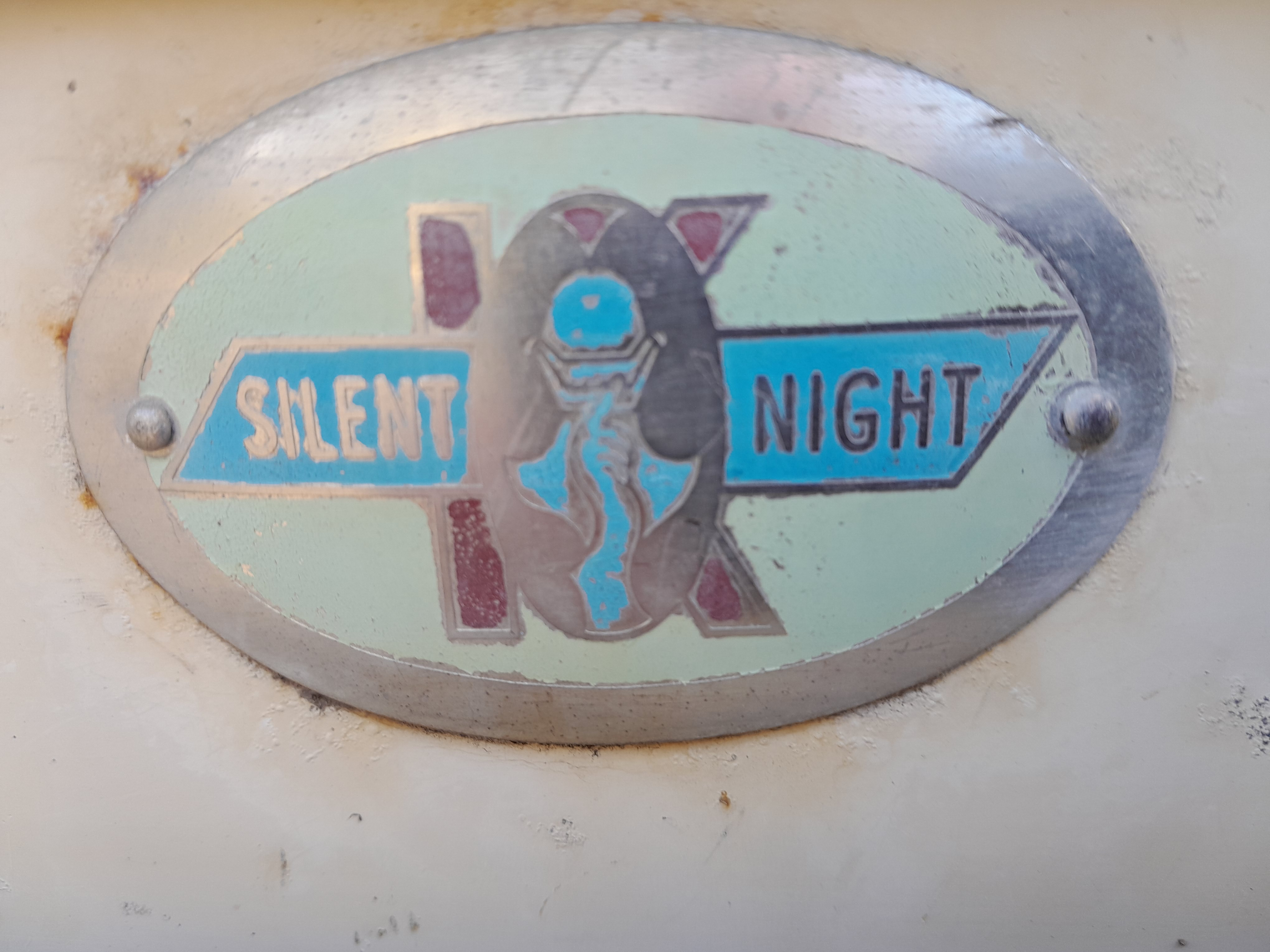
Silent knight brand badge on an upright refrigerator.

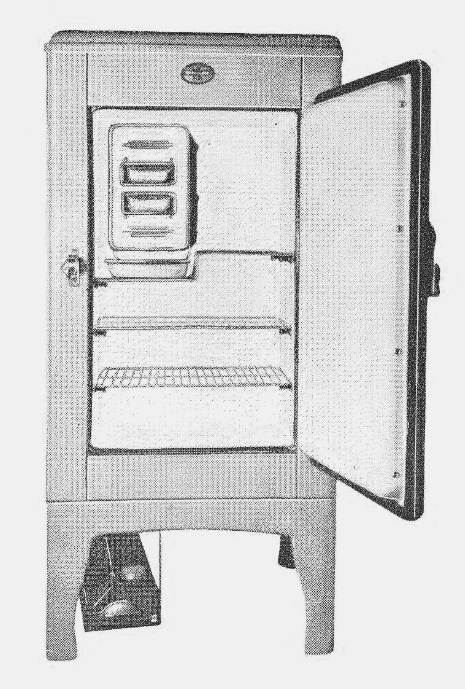
"Silent Knight" refrigerator (kerosene-powered model)

The famous brand name, "Silent Knight", was being used by mid 1940. These upright refrigerators were suited both to Hallstrom's traditional rural customers—many still not connected to electrical mains supply—and to those living in urban areas. The end of the war and returning military personnel would bring a rapid increase in family formation, and with that a high demand for refrigerators.

The refrigerators were produced in a factory in Willoughby under the business name of Hallstroms Pty Ltd. During World War II the factory manufactured munitions, as well as refrigerators for the use of the United States Army.

By the mid-1940s, the factory was producing around 1,200 refrigerators weekly, which were exported as well as sold locally. In 1949, demand was so high that there was said to be a delay of seven months for retailers to obtain new stock. The "Hallstrom Silent Knight" was a fairly priced, locally produced product at a time (post-war era) when imported refrigerators were very expensive. Their resulting popularity made Hallstrom a millionaire.

Hallstrom was the sole owner of this business. Hallstrom claimed in 1937 that he had never accepted a penny of outside capital, nor had a board of directors to demand large profits, and that he was responsible to no one but himself. Hallstrom was quoted as saying, "My main interest in the business is not large profits, but the technical work of my products." The ability to use his profits, as he alone saw fit, allowed him to become a notable philanthropist.

== Gallery of early models ==
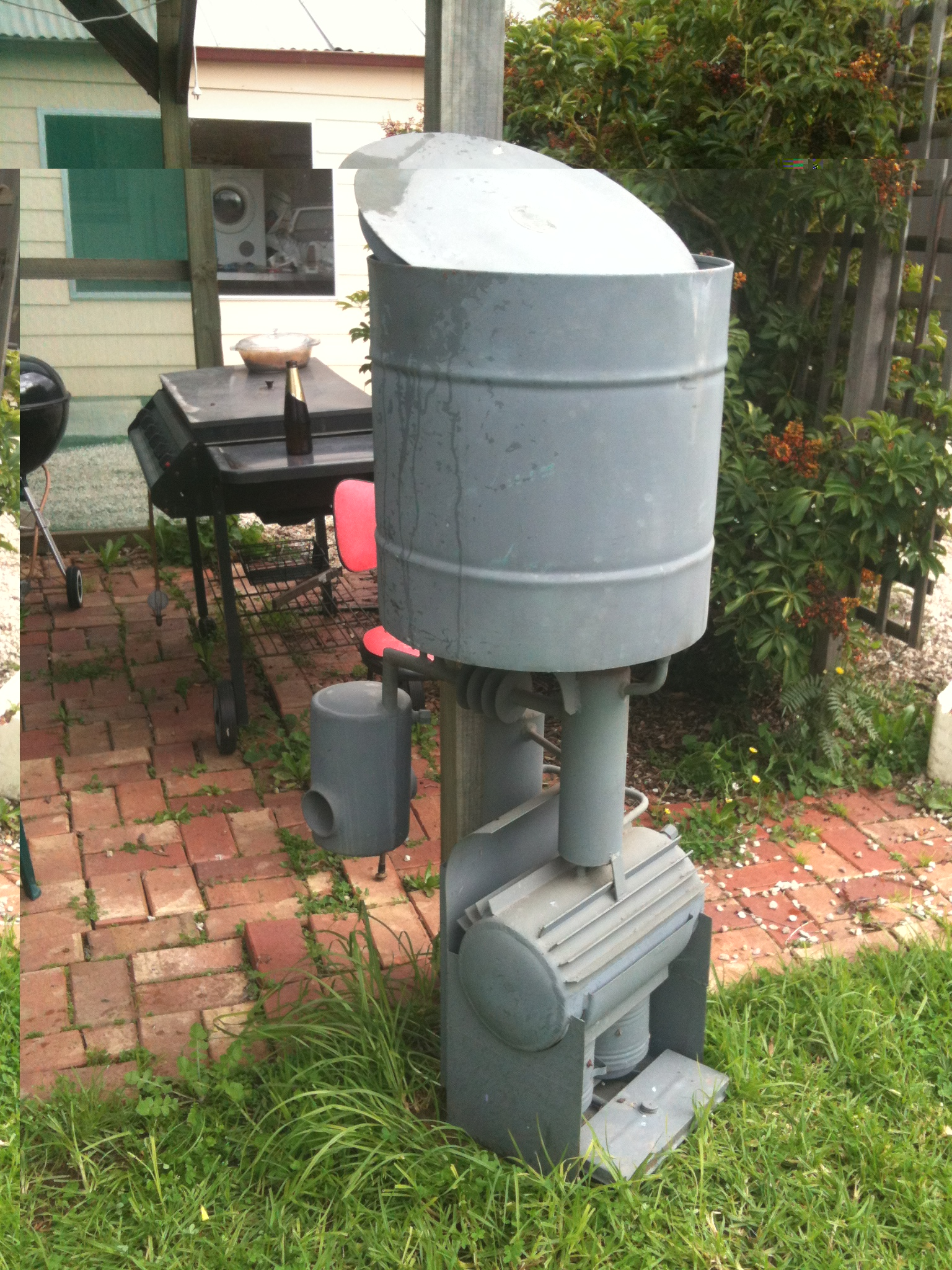
Edward Hallstrom refrigeration unit

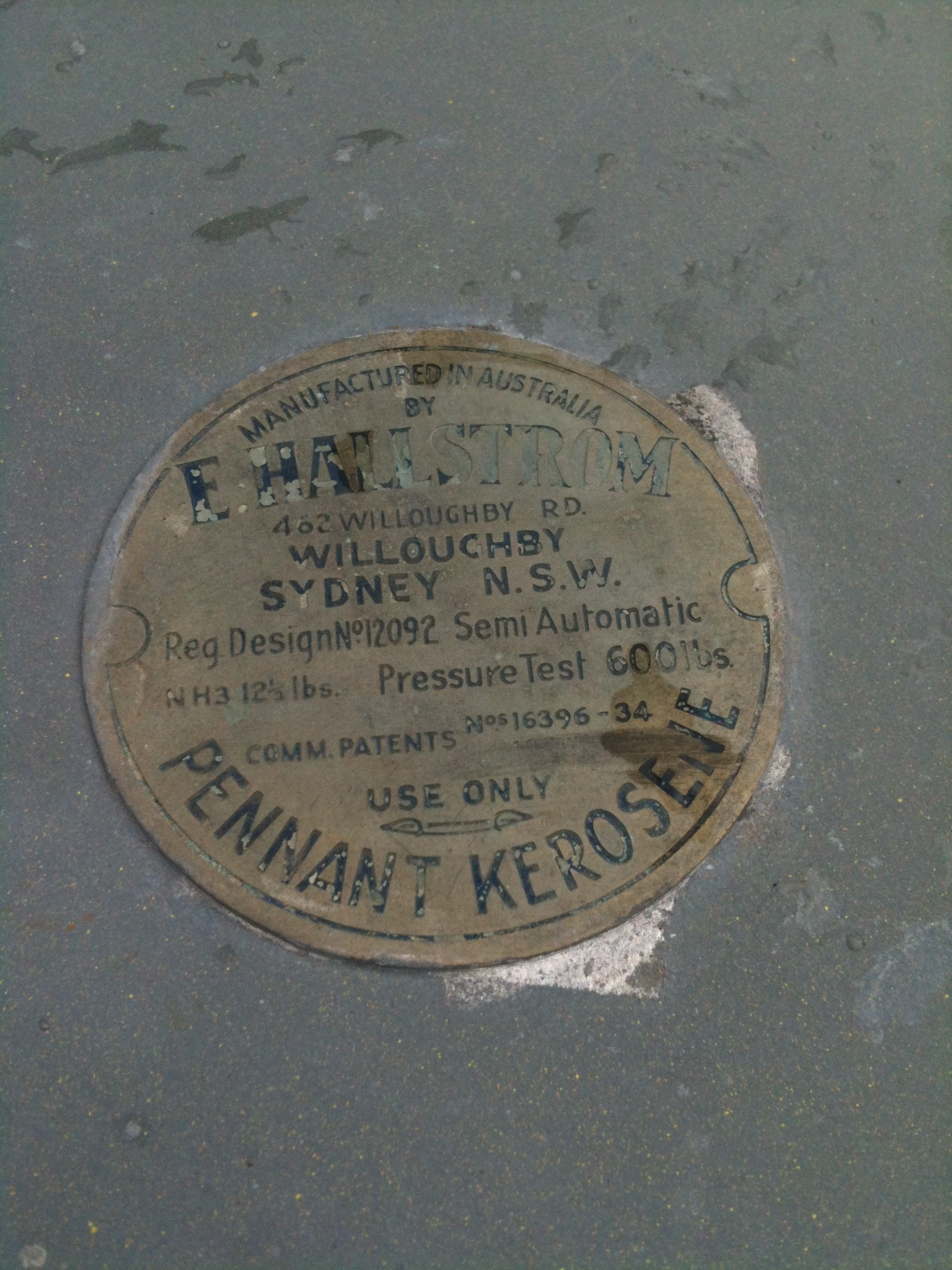
Lid of Hallstrom refrigeration unit, nameplate with 1934 patent reference.

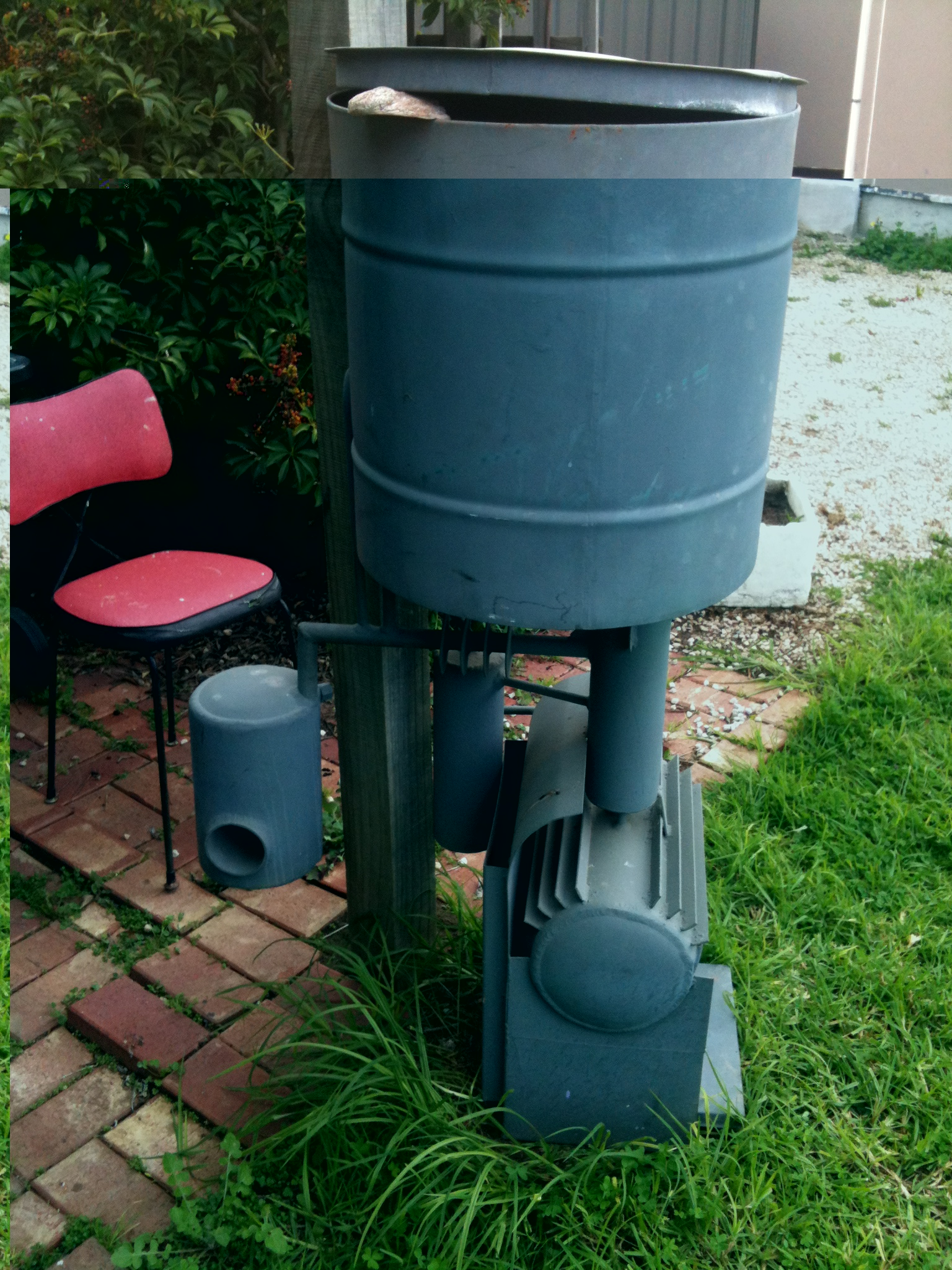
Side view of Hallstrom kerosene ammonia refrigeration unit

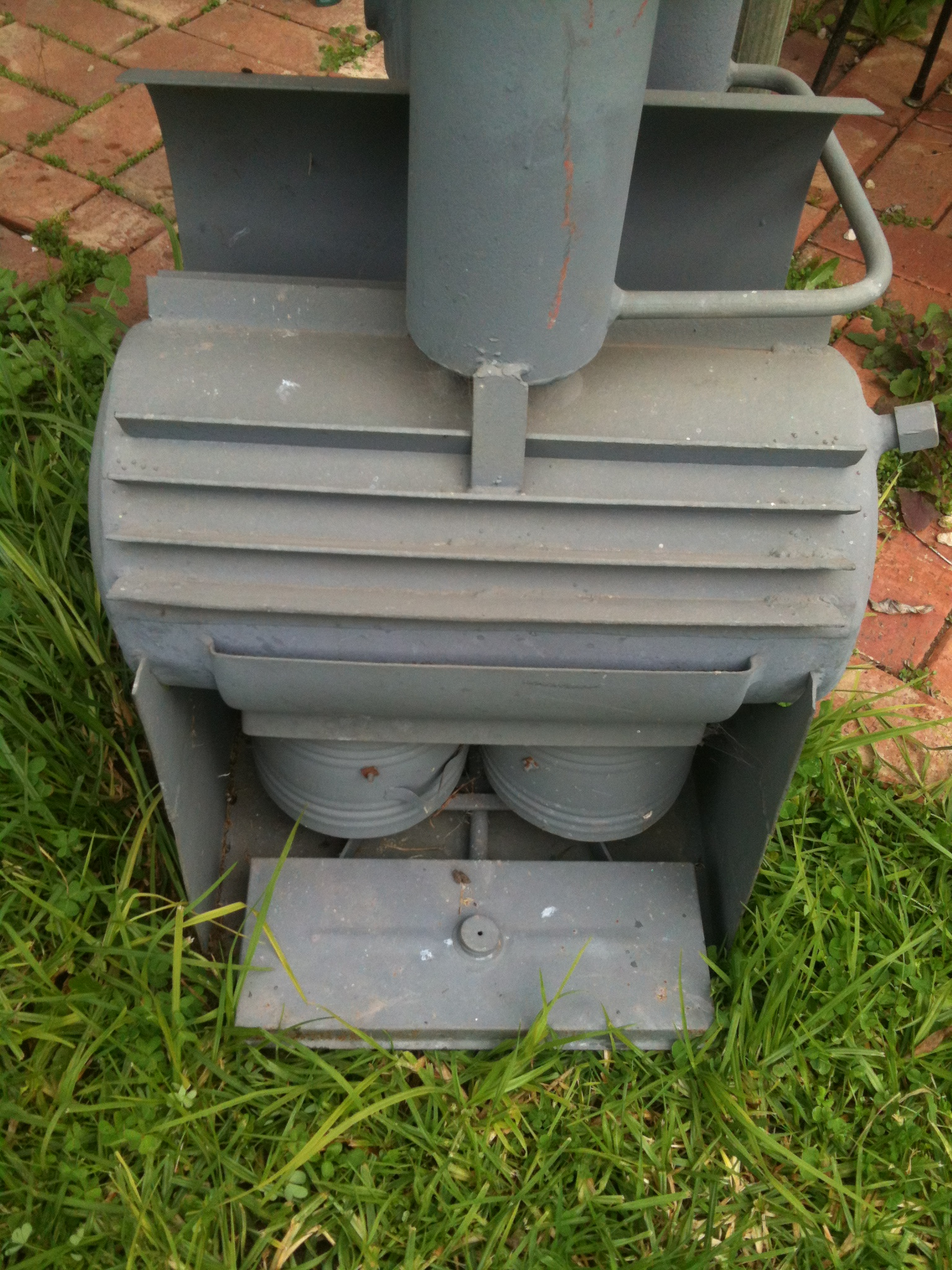
Twin Kerosene burners of Hallstrom kerosene ammonia refrigeration unit

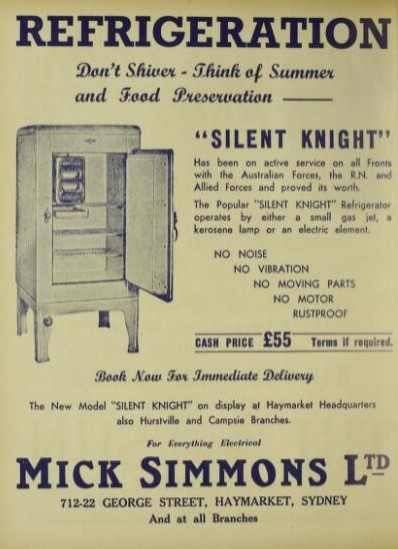
Advertisement for Silent Knight upright refrigerator (June 1946)

== Philanthropy ==
Having lived an early life of hardship and enduring a second period of hardship in middle age, Hallstrom held a view that the mere accumulation of wealth was not enough. He was quoted, by his daughter Esme, as saying, "It's nice to have money. It oils the wheels, but never get carried away with it. Selfishly hoarding up wealth unnecessarily for personal power or self gratification does no good for anybody." He went on saying, "I never forget where the money comes from in the first place, just the ordinary working man mostly. Probably had to scrape the bottom of the barrel to pay for his refrigerator. So it's only common decency to give back what you can and hopefully where it will do the most good."

Hallstrom directed much of his fortune to the Taronga Zoological Park in Sydney, becoming a trustee and later chairman of the zoo. He personally funded the purchase of many large and exotic species from overseas. His major first involvement was when he funded the purchase of two rhinoceroses, in 1937. In 1947 alone, Hallstrom donated 1,649 birds and animals to the zoo, and he donated its first gorilla and its new enclosure, in 1959.

Hallstrom established a farm to produce fresh food for the zoo animals, and also set up a fauna reserve on the outskirts of Sydney, later to form part of the Muogamarra Nature Reserve. His company sponsored a conservation-oriented panel program Nature Speaks, from 1947 to 1954, on radio 2GB, compered by John Dease.

Hallstrom was also generous in his financial gifts to hospitals and medical research centres as well as numerous charities. His reputation as a philanthropist resulted in his being besieged with requests for financial assistance, and he was known to take personal interest in the many letters and requests he received.

Hallstrom was generous to those who had fallen on hard times. In 1949, forced to lay off 550 employees of his factory, due to a shortage of critical materials caused by a lengthy coal strike, Hallstrom's company paid their furniture and house hire-purchase installments, until they could restart work, and he invited such employees facing financial difficulties to apply for special help. In 1952, he offered a free new-model Silent Knight refrigerator to replace any uninsured one lost in the bushfires of that year.

In 1959 Hallstrom brought the first Koala bears to The United States starting with the San Diego Zoo and ending with The San Francisco Zoo and an exclusive private dinner at The Olympic Golf and Country Club bringing a Koala Bear for the guests to see and experience.

He is also believed to have donated over A$4 million to philanthropic causes during his lifetime, equivalent to many times that amount at current values.

== Honours and memberships ==
Hallstrom was knighted as a Knight Bachelor, in 1952, for his philanthropic and public services. He received gold medals from zoological societies in Belgium and San Diego, California. He also received an honorary Swedish knighthood.

He was also the first Australian to be named "Father of the Year", in 1957.

Hallstrom was a member of zoological societies in Sydney (Royal Zoological Society of New South Wales), London (Zoological Society of London) and New York (New York Zoological Society) and was also a member of the Explorers Club and the Royal Australian Historical Society.

He was a Freemason. He was an Honorary Ranger, and took that role seriously.

== Later life ==
With Hallstrom both aging and increasingly devoted to philanthropic projects, Hallstrom absorption refrigerators became less competitive with more modern designs, and the market for kerosene-powered refrigerators shrank as electrical power reticulation was extended in rural areas. From the early 1950s, Hallstrom's factory was producing conventional electric refrigerators, based on the vapour-compression cycle, with sealed unit compressors, under the "Silent Knight" brand. This type of refrigerator had a larger capacity. However, the company also continued to manufacture absorption refrigerators, powered by kerosene or gas, for its traditional markets in areas without electricity.

His philanthropy raised the public profile of Hallstrom and his wife, after 1952, Lady Hallstrom. She was one of the 300 Australian official guests, at the coronation of Queen Elizabeth, in 1953.

As well as his involvement with Taronga Zoo as chairman of the Taronga Zoological Park Trust, Hallstrom had his own menagerie on 65 acres of land that he owned at Mona Vale. Hallstrom's collection included a mob of white-coloured kangaroos and wallabies. Hallstrom attempted to breed animals and birds that were at risk of extinction there. The land at Mona Vale also produced fodder and fresh animal foods for the Zoo. There was also another private zoo, housing numerous birds and some pet monkeys, in the grounds of his home at Northbridge.

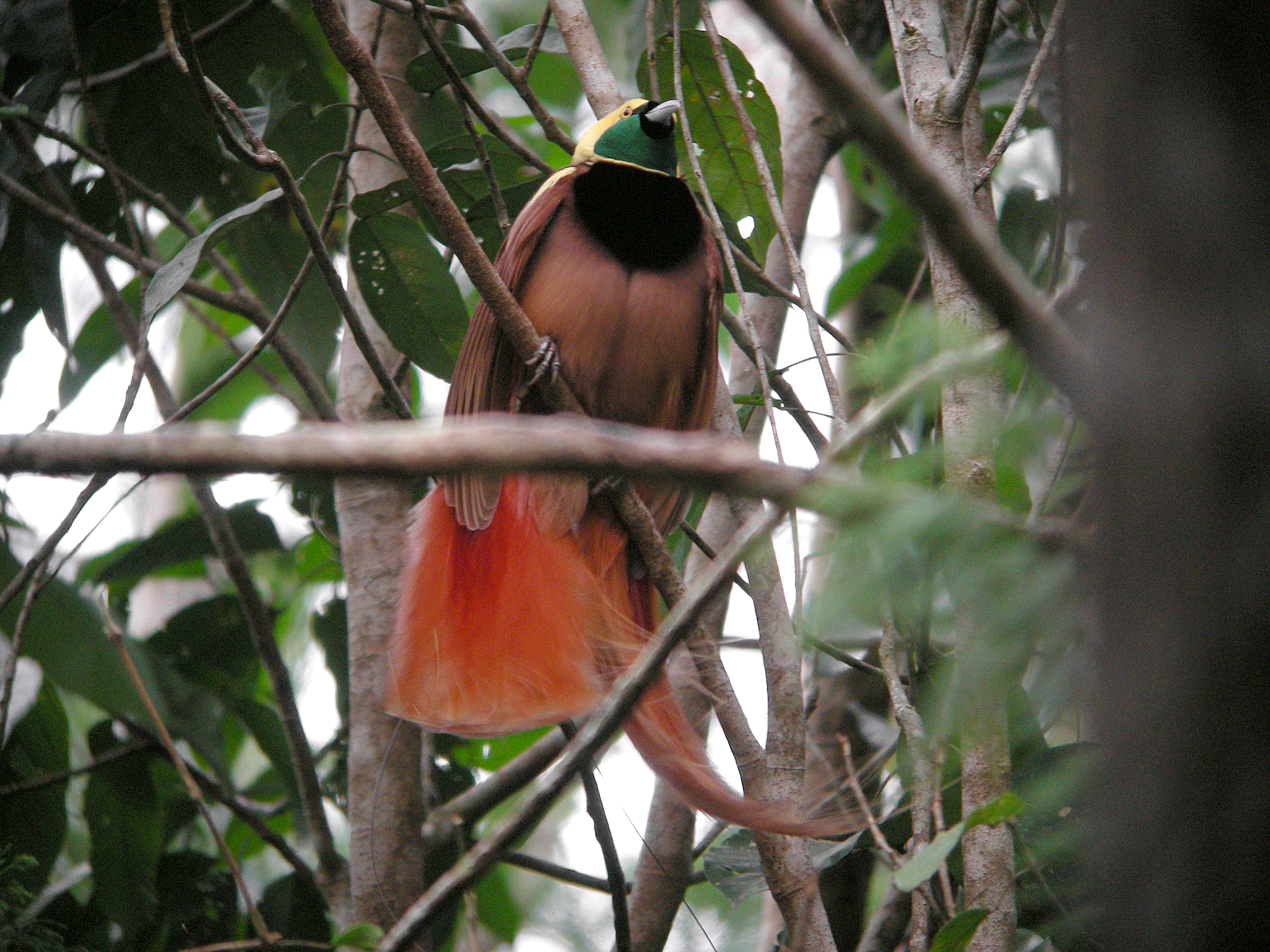
The many species of birds-of-paradise were one of Hallstrom's particular interests.

Hallstrom had aviaries at Nondugl in the Wahgi Valley of the Western Highlands of Papua New Guinea. This largely avicultural facility, managed from 1953 by Fred Shaw Mayer, later became known as the Nondugl Bird of Paradise Sanctuary. It acted mainly as a staging post for Taronga Zoo in Sydney, either to provide birds directly for Taronga, or for exchanges with other zoos. In 1967, Mayer was also involved in establishing the Baiyer River Sanctuary, set up after Hallstrom donated part of his collection of birds-of-paradise to the Australian-administered government of Papua New Guinea.

Not all Hallstrom's ideas ended in success. An attempt to farm Romney sheep at Nondugl failed, when—after several years of apparently thriving—the animals became infested with gastrointestinal worms. At the height of its initial success, in 1949, Hallstrom was able to show his lifelong friend, then Governor-General William McKell, over the sheep-raising venture, and host a feast, complete with war dancers, of 60 roasted pigs and tons of sweet potatoes. However, many years later, others did succeed, where Hallstrom had failed, by introducing sheep with genetic inheritance of the Priangan tropical sheep breed to Papua New Guinea.

Hallstrom's adult children had all married and left their childhood home. He and Lady Hallstrom, while not estranged, led increasingly separate lives, as years progressed. Margaret Hallstrom pursued her interests of painting and travel, making a seven-month overseas tour in 1953-1954. In his later years, Hallstrom usually stayed in a spartan flat at the factory, on weekday nights, and generally only returned to his home at Northbridge, only 4 km away, for weekends.

Still beginning his work day at 7:30 a.m., he would leave the factory, in his chauffeur-driven car, at 1:30 p.m., to spend the rest of his day at the Taronga Zoological Park. A 1959 film shows him bounding out of his large American-made car in his enthusiasm, almost before it had stopped. He would visit the animals and even handle some of them himself, while wearing his characteristic double-breasted suit and bow tie. The Zoo was a huge part of his later life, and was something of which he was proud.

In a response in an interview, published in October 1965, Hallstrom said, "The only man who could have told the story of myself and the work I have done is dead, and I have never confided much in others." The resulting article made scant mention of his inventions—other than his self-dismissive claim that he had just worked by trial and error—and made no mention at all of his years of financial difficulty; much of the article concerns the zoos, sanctuaries and, above all, the animals and birds that were the true passion of his later years.

By the mid 1960s, there was an increasing perception that the Taronga Zoological Park was being treated by Hallstrom as if it were his personal plaything, to the detriment of the institution itself and the many animals crowded into what were by then seen as its inadequate enclosures. Such perceptions were reinforced by his apparent unwillingness to relinquish control over the Zoo. Hallstrom declared, in 1959, that his son, John, already deputy chairman of the Taronga Zoological Park Trust, would succeed him as chairman. By then, Hallstrom had already exceeded the compulsory retirement age of 70, by three years. In fact, he remained Chairman, until 1964, after which he remained a member of the Trust, holding the position at the Zoo of its Honorary Director, until 1966.

Hallstrom become involved in controversy over his long-term stewardship and continuing influence over the Taronga Zoo. Two state government inquiries criticised his lack of professional training in zoology as well as the extent of his use of concrete in animal enclosures.

An editorial in the Sun newspaper, while admitting that the Zoo was run down and dated, contended that the N.S.W. Government had been content to leave, even encourage, Hallstrom to run the Zoo, and largely fund it too, for 25 years, while they had been neglectful of their own responsibilities for the Zoo and its animals. However, with Hallstrom now in his eighties, it was apparent that his time running the Zoo was at its end, even to Hallstrom himself. According to biographer Audrey Tate:

The inquiries shook Hallstrom badly. He rejected the notion that an ardent love of animals could be superseded by professional training and that "scientists found it impossible to communicate with him". From 1966 he was also under covert surveillance for illegal trafficking in fauna. Four years later, thirty-five people were convicted of that offence and it was thought that Hallstrom may have used his influence to have his involvement concealed. Whatever the truth, in 1968, dispirited and unwell, he donated his personal collection of birds and animals worth more than $20,000 to the zoo.

After his donation of birds to the Zoo, only thirty of approximately 900 birds remained at his home at Northbridge.

Hallstrom's wife of 56 years, Margaret, died in May 1968, compounding his despondency.

In June 1969, he married Dr Mary Mabel Maguire, née McElhone, a widow and an old friend. She was a Sydney gynaecologist and the eldest daughter of Arthur McElhone. Dr Mary Mabel Maguire and her first husband, Dr Frederick Arthur Maguire, had worked together in cancer research that had been supported financially by Hallstrom. Hallstrom's second marriage was short, as Hallstrom had less than a year to live.

== Death ==
Hallstrom died at Northbridge on 27 February 1970, and was survived by his second wife and the son and three daughters of his first marriage to Margaret Elliott Jaffrey. Hallstrom left an estate valued at $1,049,627, reduced to $974,914 by death duty, which was less than a quarter of what he was said to have given away. His second wife received a one tenth share, each of his three daughters a one twelfth share, with the balance to his son.

== Aftermath ==
Later in the same year that Hallstrom died, there was an attempt to revive the iconic "Silent Knight" brand, with a new model of Hallstrom refrigerator, but it did not last. Hallstrom's son John had been involved in the refrigerator business since his teens, and had run the factory operations, but the factory closed soon after Hallstrom's death. By that time, Hallstrom was one of the smaller Australian refrigerator manufacturers, and it had never made other large domestic appliances. As import protection levels decreased, there would be a rationalisation of the other manufacturers' operations, until only one local manufacturer remained; its whitegoods operations were bought, by Hallstrom's early nemesis, Electrolux, in 2000. The last refrigerator made in Australia was produced in April 2016.

John Hallstrom relocated the plastics division of the Hallstrom businesses to Bathurst, under the name, Polystrom Plastics Pty Ltd, and was involved in running it until around the time of his own death in 1998. It remained a family-owned business, later carried on by one of Hallstrom's grandsons. The company was put into liquidation, in November 2021, and the factory is no longer in operation.

With his family no longer centred in Sydney, Hallstrom's home at Northbridge was sold in 1971 then demolished, and its land subdivided.

Taronga Zoo was redeveloped to provide a more natural environment for its animals. However, by 2021, it would once again be accused of having "too much concrete".

== Legacy ==
=== Philanthropy ===
Hallstrom is now mainly remembered for his philanthropy.

=== Business achievements ===
Hallstrom's achievements in business and as a self-taught refrigeration engineer are considered remarkable. Hallstrom had been bankrupted in 1926, at around 40 years of age, after having seen his first manufacturing business go under. After his discharge from bankruptcy in 1932, he opened a factory just two years later, in 1934, which by mid 1938 employed 150 skilled workers and produced 300 refrigerators per week. By the mid 1940s, around the time that Hallstrom was 60, it was making 1,200 "Silent Knight" refrigerators per week. Personal ownership of a successful company allowed him to do much as he pleased with the personal fortune that it generated.

=== Taxation case law ===
Hallstrom's name is associated with a piece of Australian taxation case law: the High Court's decision that the money his company spent, opposing Electolux's petition to extend its patent in 1938, had not been a deductible expense.

=== Taronga Zoo ===
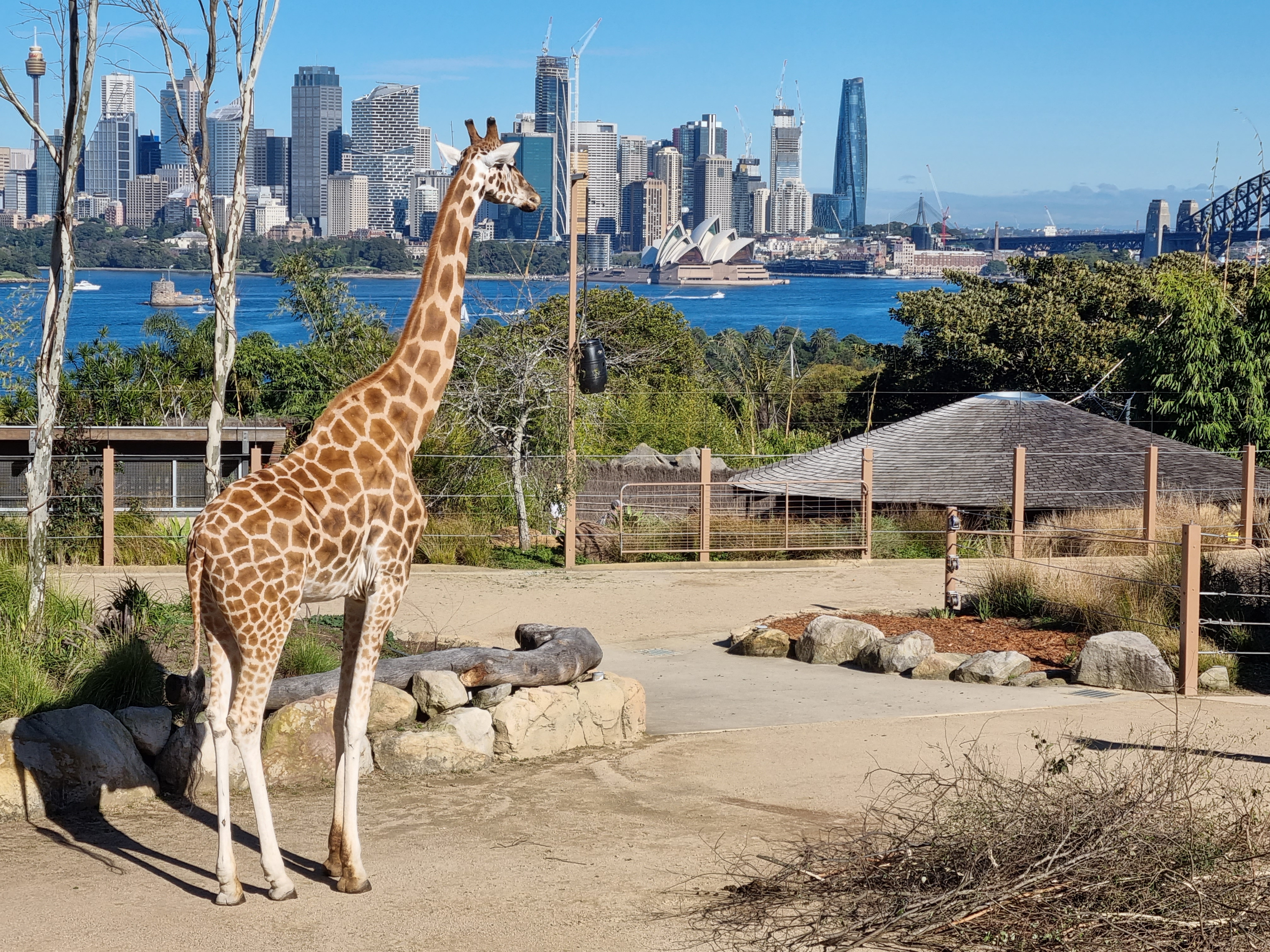
Giraffe at Taronga Zoo

Although it was reformed and modernised after his tenure, reflecting a subsequent emphasis on scientific research, conservation and education, the Taronga Zoo is Hallstrom's main legacy. There is a memorial plaque bearing his image and a commemorative blue plaque, both at the zoo. However, long after his death, further allegations of his involvement in illegal trafficking of wildlife would be made.

=== Western Plains Zoo ===
The ill-advised over-stocking of the Taronga Zoo collection with large animals—its collection included 66 red kangaroos, 15 lions, 12 tigers, 15 giraffes, 38 red deer, 44 fallow deer, and 11 elephants, in 1966—and the need to house parts of the Zoo's collection, during urgently needed redevelopment of its enclosures, led to the formation of the open-range Western Plains Zoo, near Dubbo. As animal welfare became a greater priority, the new facility would also become the home of large animals from other zoos. That zoo is also, even if indirectly, a part of Hallstrom's legacy.

=== Various species named after Hallstrom ===
- Hemiscyllium hallstromi or Papuan epaulette shark
- Delias hallstromi, a butterfly endemic to the Central Mountains, Chimbu Province and Western Province of Papua New Guinea
- Pteridophora alberti hallstromi or King-of-Saxony bird-of-paradise of New Guinea (synonymous with Pteridophora alberti bürgersi)
- Psittacella madaraszi hallstromi, a subspecies of Madarasz's Tiger Parrot found in New Guinea.
- Canis hallstromi or 'Hallstrom's Dog' (former name), when the New Guinea singing dog was considered to be a separate species. It is now more generally considered to be a domesticated dog known to share a common ancestry with the Australian dingo, but its status remains contested, following the 2016 discovery of a wild dog population in New Guinea (a.k.a. New Guinea Highland wild dogs).

=== Hallstrom Theatre in the Australian Museum ===
The Hallstrom Theatre in the Australian Museum, was named after him, following his generous gift, in 1958, that financed its remodelling.

=== Hallstrom Park and old factory sites ===
Hallstrom Park, on land opposite where his factory once stood at 462-464 Willoughby Road, Willoughby, is named after him. In 1946, he had contributed £3,000 for improvements to the land to allow it to be used for recreational and sporting purposes. The area closest to the road was known for many years as the Hallstrom Playing Fields, before the area was extended eastward over what had been the open-air rubbish tip of Willoughby Municipality, as the Bicentennial Reserve. The factory site itself is now occupied by apartment blocks. It closed not long after Hallstrom's death, stood empty for a while, and was demolished around 1975. The site of his former home at 26 Artarmon Road, Willoughby, where Hallstrom first manufactured his refrigerators, before his factory opened, later became part of the Channel 9 studios, later redeveloped as yet more apartments.

=== Hallstrom Point ===
Hallstrom Point on Middle Harbour at Northbridge, and the roadway on it, Hallstrom Close, is named after him. It was the site of his former home, Figtree House, which was demolished after his death. Much of what is the modern-day Hallstrom Close lies inside the 2.25 acres of harbourside land that were his former house's grounds, with its private zoo. Most of the site is now occupied by eight large waterfront houses, but a portion of 2,803 m^{2}, at the tip of the point, is a public waterfront reserve. It still has the native figtrees that gave Hallstrom's former home its name.

=== Edward Hallstrom Faunal Reserve (1961–1969) ===
The southern part of what is now the Muogamarra Nature Reserve was known as the Edward Hallstrom Faunal Reserve, between 1961 and 1969. It resulted from a collaboration between Hallstrom and the conservationist Allen Strom, which aimed to protect a population of koalas on that land.

=== National Library of Australia ===
Hallstrom Pacific Collection

Hallstrom donated a collection of over 1,600 rare books on Asia and the Pacific, to the Commonwealth Government in 1948. Initially, the collection became the Hallstrom Pacific Library of the Australian School of Pacific Administration at Middle Head. When that institution closed, the collection passed to the National Library of Australia and was subsequently placed on permanent loan to the University of New South Wales. However, the books are once again part of the National Library's collection, identified by the series "Hallstrom Pacific Collection" that now comprises 1,765 items.

Family account

Hallstrom's daughter, Esme Bell, wrote an account of her family, Never say never, self-published in 2007, a copy of which is held in the National Library of Australia.

=== Art collections and museum collections ===
Hallstrom gifted a collection of paintings of animals and birds by the French-American self-taught naturalist and artist John James Audubon to President Truman, in 1951, for the National Gallery of Art, Washington D.C.

Two photographic portraits of Hallstrom by Max Dupain are in the collection or the National Portrait Gallery, as is a portrait in oils of Hallstrom, by his daughter Esme Bell. Willoughby City Library has photographs of the factory in Willoughby Road.

The Museum of Applied Arts and Sciences collection includes a Hallstrom "Silent Knight" electric refrigerator from 1958.
