= Vaccine cooler =

Many vaccines require refrigeration to remain active, and the lack of infrastructure to maintain the cool chain to reliably bring vaccines into more remote areas of developing countries poses a serious challenge to national immunization programs. Portable vaccine cooler units have been proposed by several technologists. The WHO Performance, Quality and Safety (PQS) programme is a driver of the technology.

== Technology development ==
In 2005 Ian Tansley of Sure Chill designed an ice-chest vaccine cooler regulated by the density of water. Since water has greatest density at around 4 °C, putting the vaccine chamber at the bottom of a thermo-syphon regulates the temperature at between 2 °C and 8 °C, as long as there is ice and the heat-exchange capacity is not overloaded. Sure Chill claimed to be WHO approved and in use for vaccine storage in 46 countries.

A refrigeration device was shown for this purpose by Adam Grosser at a TED Talk in 2007, but had not been produced commercially as of 2020. Grosser's proposed device uses exposure to a cooking fire for 30 minutes to store heat. After a cooling period of an hour, the device is placed into a 15-litre container, which contains the vaccine. His concept calls for a 24-hour re-cycle period.

It was revealed in March 2008 that another class of long-term Vaccine Cooler is based around an Ice Box with separate Ice and Vaccine chambers. Using ice as the energy storage device allows the Vaccine Cooler to operate for long periods without power: separating the vaccine chamber from the ice chamber allows temperature regulation while avoiding the need for special packing and conditioning of the cold packs. Suggestions have included the use of a regulated heat pipe to connect the vaccine chamber and the ice chamber.

In September 2008 it was reported that Malcolm McCulloch of Oxford University was heading a three-year project to develop more robust appliances that could be used in locales lacking electricity, and that his team had completed a prototype of his renewal of the Einstein refrigerator. He was quoted as saying that improving the design and changing the types of gases used might allow the design's efficiency to be quadrupled. The three working fluids in this design are water, ammonia and butane.

The Free Piston Stirling Cooler, a type of mechanical refrigerator, was brought to market before 2010 by Twinbird Corporation of Japan. In 2016 Will Broadway won the James Dyson Award for a vaccine cooler based on a miniaturisation of the bi-fluid Icyball technology. Broadway's design uses electricity or propane as the heat source. As of August 2019, Broadway claimed an 88-hour cool-life under WHO PQS test conditions, whereas competitor products could only meet a nine-hour cool-life.
