= FPSC =

FPSC may refer to:

- Federal Public Service Commission, a federal agency of Government of Pakistan located in Islamabad City
- Florida Public Service Commission, a regulatory organization in the state of Florida, US
- Free Piston Stirling Cooler, a type of mechanical refrigerator
