= Adsorption refrigeration =

Refrigeration method

Adsorption refrigeration was invented by Michael Faraday in 1821, even though the basis of artificial modern refrigeration dates back to 1748 with William Cullen's experiments. Adsorption is sometimes referred to as solid sorption.

In adsorption refrigeration, adsorbate vapour molecules, the refrigerant, adsorb onto the surface of a solid instead of dissolving into a liquid. Adsorption refrigeration also includes a generation process where refrigerant vapour molecules desorb from the solid. In this process, there is no use of CFCs or ammonia; the thermally driven cooling process is environment friendly.

The characteristics of the adsorbent/refrigerant pair is crucial in determining the system performance of an adsorption refrigeration system. The typical system performance indicators for an adsorption refrigeration system are the coefficient of performance and the specific cooling effect. The adsorbent is a solid, such as silica gel, activated carbon, or zeolite. For example, an adsorption refrigeration device with active carbon fiber as the adsorbent and ammonia as the refrigerant was designed.

Adsorption refrigeration has been extensively researched in recent years because the technology is often noiseless, non-corrosive and environmentally friendly. The heat source for adsorption refrigeration can be fossil fuel, biomass fuel, nuclear fission, geothermal energy, waste heat, or solar thermal energy.

Adsorption refrigerators are available in the marketplace and are mainly used to produce chilled water from waste heat. Gas adsorption heat pumps are not currently available in the UK, but are just being introduced in Europe as small water or ground source packaged units that provide domestic, low-temperature space heating.

It is very similar to absorption refrigeration (note that the second letter is different) where an absorber absorbs the refrigerant vapour into a liquid. The refrigerants used in absorption systems are ammonia, water, or methanol, etc, which all experience phase changes between the vapor and liquid states – the same as in vapor compression refrigeration.
