= Icyball =

Early refrigerators invented in the 1920s

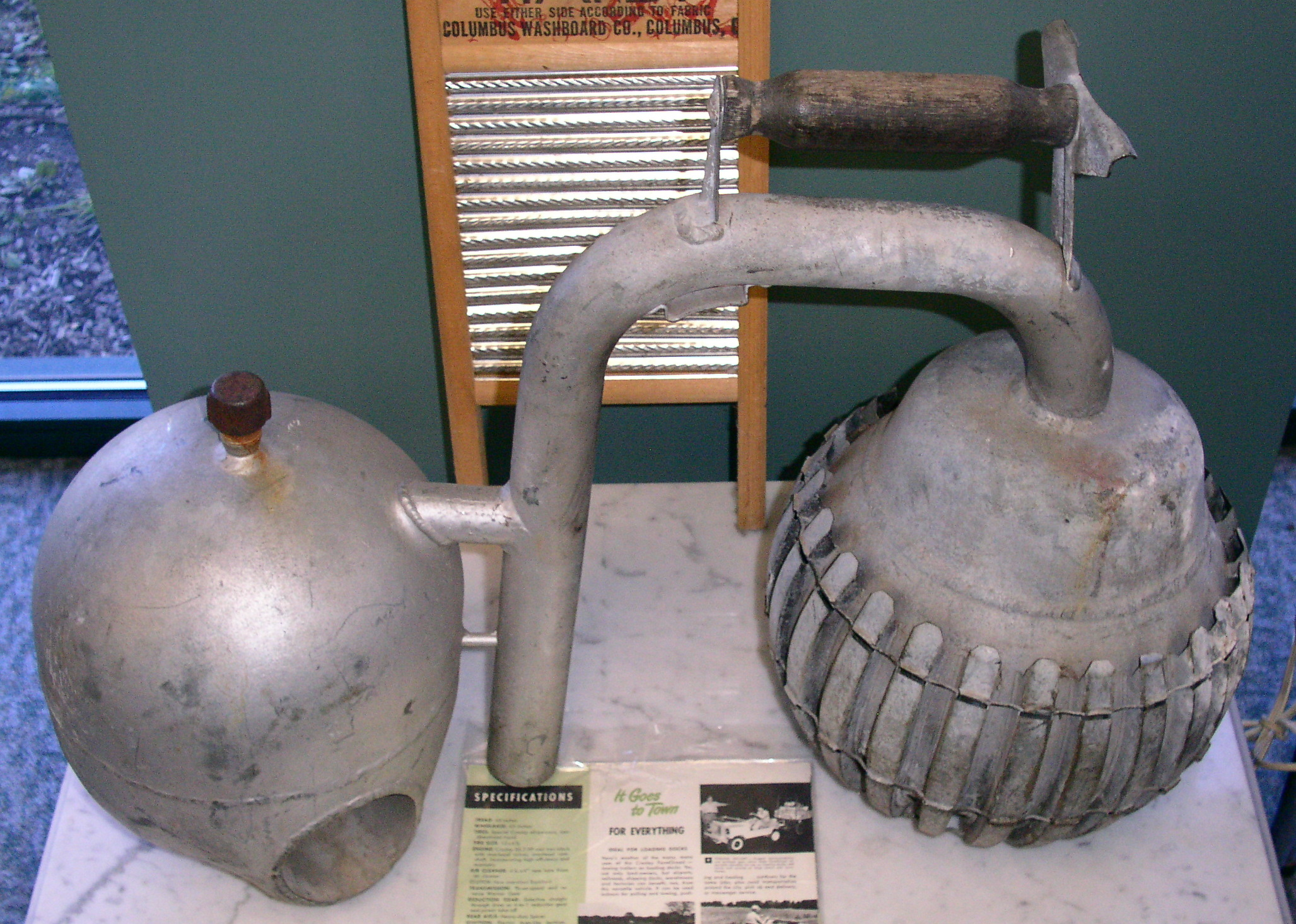
A Crosley IcyBall with cold side ball on left, hot side ball on right

Icyball is a name given to two early refrigerators, one made by Australian Sir Edward Hallstrom in 1923, and the other design patented by David Forbes Keith of Toronto (filed 1927, granted 1929). Keith's design was manufactured by American Powel Crosley Jr., who bought the rights to the device. Both devices are unusual in design in that they did not require the use of electricity for cooling. They can run for a day on a cup of kerosene, allowing rural users lacking electricity the benefits of refrigeration.

== Crosley Icyball ==
Powel and Lewis Crosley began investigating refrigeration processes in 1927, hiring Canadian engineer David Forbes Keith. Keith had already patented a design for absorption refrigeration in Canada, and showed it to the Crosleys.

The Crosley Radio Corporation began selling the Icyball in 1929.

=== Operation ===
The Crosley Icyball is as an example of a gas-absorption refrigerator, as can be found today in recreational vehicles or campervans. Unlike most refrigerators, the Icyball has no moving parts, and instead of operating continuously, is manually cycled. Typically it is charged in the morning for 1.5 hours, and provides cooling throughout the heat of the day.

Absorption refrigerators and the more common mechanical refrigerators both cool by the evaporation of refrigerant. (Evaporation of a liquid causes cooling, as for example, liquid sweat on the skin evaporating cools, and the reverse process releases much heat.) In absorption refrigerators, the buildup of pressure due to evaporation of refrigerant is relieved not by suction at the inlet of a compressor, but by absorption into an absorptive medium (water in the case of the Icy Ball).

The Icyball system moves heat from the refrigerated cabinet to the warmer room by using ammonia as the refrigerant. It consists of two metal balls: a hot ball, which in the fully charged state contains the absorber (water) and a cold ball containing liquid ammonia. These are joined by a pipe in the shape of an inverted U. The pipe allows ammonia gas to move in either direction.

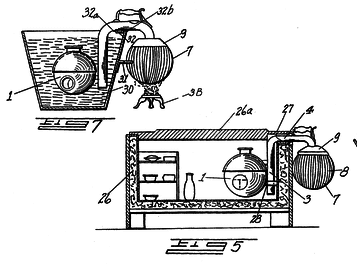
Patent diagrams "showing the device in the act of generation and condensation" (left) and "illustrating the device in use food storage box or refrigerator in the act of evaporation and absorption" (right)

After approximately a day's use (varying depending on load), the Icyball stops cooling, and needs recharging. The Icyball is removed from the refrigerated cabinet, and the cold ball, from which all the ammonia has evaporated during the previous cycle, is submerged in cool water. The hot ball is then heated gently to boil off the ammonia dissolved in the water inside it. (The solubility of ammonia in water drops as temperature rises.) The pressure in the system rises to around 1.72 megapascals (249 psi), and at this temperature, the ammonia readily passes through the u-tube, and condenses in the colder ball, which is kept cool by the water bath.

When the cold ball is fully charged with liquid ammonia (indicated to the user by a whistle), the device is turned around, placing the hot ball in the cool bath. As the hot ball cools, the pressure in the system falls, eventually dropping to the point where the liquid ammonia in the cold ball begins to evaporate (ammonia has a boiling point of −33.34 °C (−28.01 °F) at standard air pressure), and the cold ball begins to freeze. After several minutes it is cool enough for ice to form on its surface. It is then placed on the stabilizer inside the refrigeration cabinet. The stabilizer is filled with an antifreeze solution which both supports the cold ball and provides a large thermal inertia to moderate the cooling. A small hole in the refrigerated cabinet allows the u-tube to pass outside into the room.

The cold ball has an opening into which an ice-cube tray could be placed, the forerunner of the "freezing compartment" in modern refrigerators.

The actual construction of the Icyball is slightly more complex than described above, to improve the efficiency: The connecting tube runs to the lower part of the warm ball, allowing the ammonia vapor to bubble through the water speeding absorption, and also serving to stir the solution so heat is better transported to the finned walls. This "bubbler" is bypassed by a liquid (no moving parts) check-valve during regeneration, so that only gas, and not liquid solution is transferred to the cold side. The operation of the liquid check valve is somewhat similar to the water seals (J-traps) used in plumbing drains. Mechanical check valves require too much pressure to function properly in this application. To minimize the amount of water transferred to the cold ball during the recharge cycle, trapping structures are placed in the upper part of the connecting tube, allowing only gas to pass, and directing water back to the warm side ball.

In practice, too high of a flame and the water will boil, contaminating the ammonia that, alone, should liquefy in the cold ball, and if the water bath is allowed to warm, the ammonia will not fully condense.

== Legacy ==
While the Crosley Icyball refrigerator is no longer sold or manufactured, absorption cycle refrigeration is still in use. In addition to RV applications, ammonia cycle refrigerators are still used in developing countries. These are also batch-cycle devices, but incorporate various condensers, check valves, and integral kerosene burners, so that the disassembly and tub of water required to reactivate an Icyball are no longer needed. Ammonia refrigeration is also used in large industrial applications, where its efficiency more than compensates for the higher initial cost, and associated risk. Though it was once fairly popular for home air conditioning, concerns related to ammonia leakage have caused mechanical refrigeration to dominate that market.

In 2007, Adam Grosser gave a TED talk about an absorption refrigerator for vaccines.

In 2016 William Broadway, a young designer, won the UK James Dyson Award for his design to miniaturize the Icyball technology for use as a vaccine cooler.

== See also ==
- Einstein refrigerator
- Thermoelectric cooling
