= Twinbird Corporation =

- Company type: Public KK
- Traded as: TYO: 6897
- Headquarters: Tsubame, Niigata
- Website: www.twinbird.jp

Twinbird Corporation, founded in 1951, is a manufacturer of household electric products with headquarters in Tsubame City, Niigata Prefecture, Japan. Shigekatsu Nomizu is the President, employing 284 people as of March 2010.

It was founded as a plating company in 1951. In the 1980s it expanded into small electrical appliances and began developing products occasionally in conjunction with other companies. The free-piston Stirling cooler is one such product that was developed jointly and under license to Global Cooling. By 2002, Twinbird released the first ever consumer product utilizing the free-piston Stirling cycle process. Before this, free-piston Stirling machines were only available at extremely high cost generally used for specialized aerospace applications. A branded version of a portable refrigerator using the free-piston Stirling cooler was sold for a time by the Coleman Company.
