= Priangan sheep =

Breed of sheep

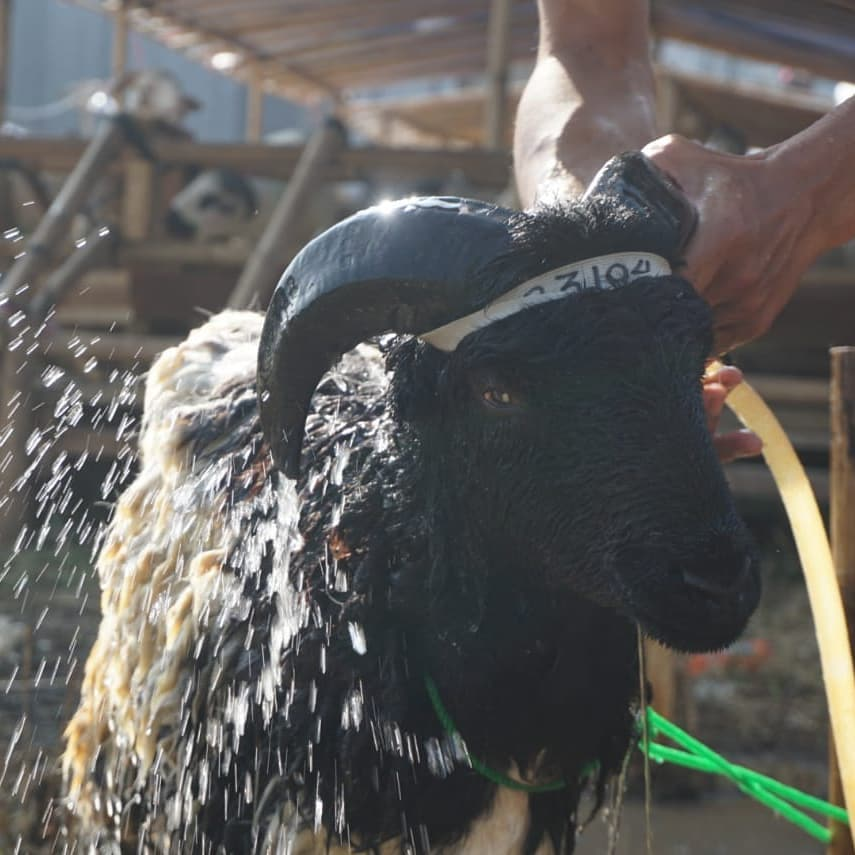
Priangan sheep

The Priangan (also known as Garut) is a breed of sheep found in West Java, Indonesia. The breed is used primarily for ram fighting and meat. It is a variety of the Javanese Thin-tailed. Africander and Merino breeding may have been introduced in the 19th century.

== Characteristics ==
They are usually black or pied, occasionally individuals will be gray or tan. Rams are horned and ewes are polled (hornless). Individuals often lack external ears. The rams are selected for size, horn size, and for fighting ability.
