= Absorption refrigerator =

Refrigerator that uses a heat source

An absorption refrigerator is a refrigerator that uses a heat source to provide the energy needed to drive the cooling process. Solar energy, burning oil, waste heat from factories, and district heating systems are examples of heat sources that can be used.

An absorption refrigerator uses two coolants, the first coolant performing evaporative cooling before being absorbed into the second coolant. Heat is then needed to reset the two coolants to their initial states.

Absorption refrigerators are commonly used in recreational vehicles (RVs), campers, and caravans because the heat required to power them can be provided by either a propane fuel burner, a low-voltage DC electric heater (from a battery or vehicle electrical system) or a mains-powered electric heater. Absorption refrigerators can also be used to air-condition buildings using the waste heat from a gas turbine or water heater in the building. Using waste heat from a gas turbine makes the turbine very efficient because it first produces electricity, then hot water, and finally, air-conditioning—trigeneration.

Unlike more common vapor-compression refrigeration systems, an absorption refrigerator has no moving parts and operates almost silently.

== History ==
In the early years of the 20th century, the vapor absorption cycle using water-ammonia systems was popular and widely used, but after the development of the vapor compression cycle it lost much of its importance because of its low coefficient of performance (about one fifth of that of the vapor compression cycle). Absorption refrigerators are an alternative to compressor refrigerators where electricity is unreliable, costly, or unavailable; also the silent action of the absorption refrigerator is an advantage where noise from the compressor is problematic; or where surplus heat is available.

In 1748 in Glasgow, William Cullen invented the basis for modern refrigeration, although he is not credited with a usable application.

Absorption refrigeration uses the same principle as adsorption refrigeration, which was invented by Michael Faraday in 1821. Instead of using a solid adsorber, an absorber in an absorption system absorbs the refrigerant vapour into a liquid.

Absorption cooling was invented by the French scientist Ferdinand Carré in 1858. The original design used water and sulphuric acid. The principle was enhanced with a three-fluid configuration in 1922 by Baltzar von Platen and Carl Munters, two students at the Royal Institute of Technology in Stockholm. This "Platen-Munters" design can operate without a pump.

Commercial production began in 1923 by the newly-formed company AB Arctic, which was bought by Electrolux in 1925, with Electrolux manufacturing domestic refrigerators based on the absorption principle well into the 1990s, citing their silent action as a key selling point compared to the compression refrigerators which dominated the market, although this advantage was eroded by their much poorer efficiency.

Also in the 1960s, absorption refrigeration saw a renaissance due to the substantial demand for refrigerators for caravans. AB Electrolux later established a subsidiary in the United States, named Dometic Sales Corporation. The company marketed refrigerators for recreational vehicles (RVs) under the Dometic brand. In 2001, Electrolux sold most of its leisure products line to the venture-capital company EQT which created Dometic as a stand-alone company. Dometic still sold absorption fridges as of July 2025.

In 1926, Albert Einstein and his former student Leó Szilárd proposed an alternative design known as the Einstein refrigerator.

At the 2007 TED Conference, Adam Grosser presented his research of an "intermittent absorption" vaccine refrigeration unit for use in third world countries. The refrigerator is a small unit placed over a campfire, that can later be used to cool 15 litres (3.3 imp gal; 4.0 US gal) of water to just above freezing for 24 hours in a 30 °C (86 °F) environment. The concept was similar to an early refrigeration device known as an Icyball.

== Principles ==
Common absorption refrigerators use a refrigerant with a very low boiling point (less than −18 °C (0 °F)) just like compressor refrigerators. Compression refrigerators typically use an HCFC or HFC, while absorption refrigerators typically use ammonia or water and need at least a second fluid able to absorb the coolant, the absorbent, respectively water (for ammonia) or brine (for water). Both types use evaporative cooling: when the refrigerant evaporates (boils), it takes some heat away with it, providing the cooling effect. The main difference between the two systems is the way the refrigerant is changed from a gas back into a liquid so that the cycle can repeat. An absorption refrigerator changes the gas back into a liquid using a method that needs only heat, and has no moving parts other than the fluids.

1: boiler 2: separation chamber 3: ammonia-poor water back-pipe 4: ammonia condenser 5: pressure balance pipe 6: liquid ammonia pipe 7: evaporator (inside cabinet) 8: ammonia gas pipe 9: absorber (water absorbs ammonia)

The absorption cooling cycle can be described in three phases:

- Evaporation: A liquid refrigerant evaporates in a low partial pressure environment, thus extracting heat from its surroundings (e.g. the refrigerator's compartment). Because of the low partial pressure, the temperature needed for evaporation is also low.
- Absorption: The second fluid, in a depleted state, sucks out the now gaseous refrigerant, thus providing the low partial pressure. This produces a refrigerant-saturated liquid which then flows to the next step:
- Regeneration: The refrigerant-saturated liquid is heated, causing the refrigerant to evaporate out.
  1. The evaporation occurs at the lower end of a narrow tube; the bubbles of refrigerant gas push the refrigerant-depleted liquid into a higher chamber, from which it will flow by gravity to the absorption chamber.
  2. The hot gaseous refrigerant passes through a heat exchanger, transferring its heat outside the system (such as to surrounding ambient-temperature air), and condenses at a higher place. The condensed (liquid) refrigerant will then flow by gravity to supply the evaporation phase.

The system thus silently provides for the mechanical circulation of the liquid without a usual pump. A third fluid, gaseous, is usually added to avoid pressure concerns when condensation occurs (see below).

In comparison, a compressor based heat pump works by pumping refrigerant gas from an evaporator to a condenser. This reduces the pressure and boiling temperature in the evaporator and increases the pressure and condensing temperature in the condenser. Energy from an electric motor or internal combustion engine is required to operate the compressor pump. Compressing the refrigerant uses this energy to do work on the gas, increasing its temperature. The warm, high pressure gas then enters the condenser where it undergoes a phase change to a liquid and releases heat to the condenser's surroundings. Warm liquid refrigerant moves from the high pressure condenser to the low pressure evaporator via an expansion valve, also known as a throttling valve or a Joule-Thomson valve. The expansion valve partially vaporizes the refrigerant cooling it via evaporative cooling, and the resulting vapor is cooled via expansive cooling. This is a combination of Joule-Thomson cooling and work done by the expanding gas, both at the expense of the internal energy of the gas. The cold, low pressure liquid refrigerant will now absorb heat from the evaporator's surroundings and vaporize. The resulting gas enters the compressor, and the cycle begins again.

=== Simple salt and water system ===
A simple absorption refrigeration system common in large commercial plants uses a solution of lithium bromide or lithium chloride salt and water. Water under low pressure is evaporated from the coils that are to be chilled. The water is absorbed by a lithium bromide/water solution. The system drives the water out of the lithium bromide solution with heat.

=== Water spray absorption refrigeration ===
Water spray absorption system

Another variant uses air, water, and a salt water solution. The intake of warm, moist air is passed through a sprayed solution of salt water. The spray lowers the humidity but does not significantly change the temperature. The less humid, warm air is then passed through an evaporative cooler, consisting of a spray of fresh water, which cools and re-humidifies the air. Humidity is removed from the cooled air with another spray of salt solution, providing the outlet of cool, dry air.

The salt solution is regenerated by heating it under low pressure, causing water to evaporate. The water evaporated from the salt solution is re-condensed, and rerouted back to the evaporative cooler.

=== Single pressure absorption refrigeration ===
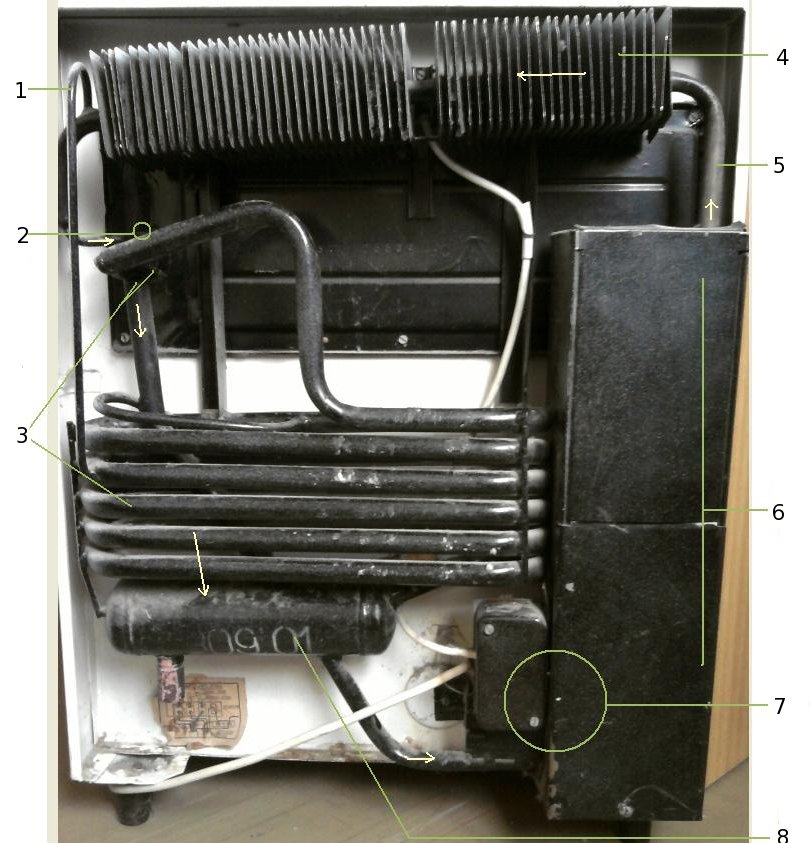
Domestic absorption refrigerator: 1. Hydrogen enters the pipe with liquid ammonia; 2. Ammonia and hydrogen enter the inner compartment. Volume increase causes a decrease in the partial pressure of the liquid ammonia. The ammonia evaporates, taking heat from the liquid ammonia (ΔH_{Vap}) lowering its temperature. Heat flows from the hotter interior of the refrigerator to the colder liquid, promoting further evaporation.; 3. Ammonia and hydrogen return from the inner compartment, ammonia returns to absorber and dissolves in water. Hydrogen is free to rise.; 4. Ammonia gas condensation (passive cooling).; 5. Hot ammonia gas.; 6. Heat insulation and distillation of ammonia gas from water.; 7. Electric heat source.; 8. Absorber vessel (water and ammonia solution).

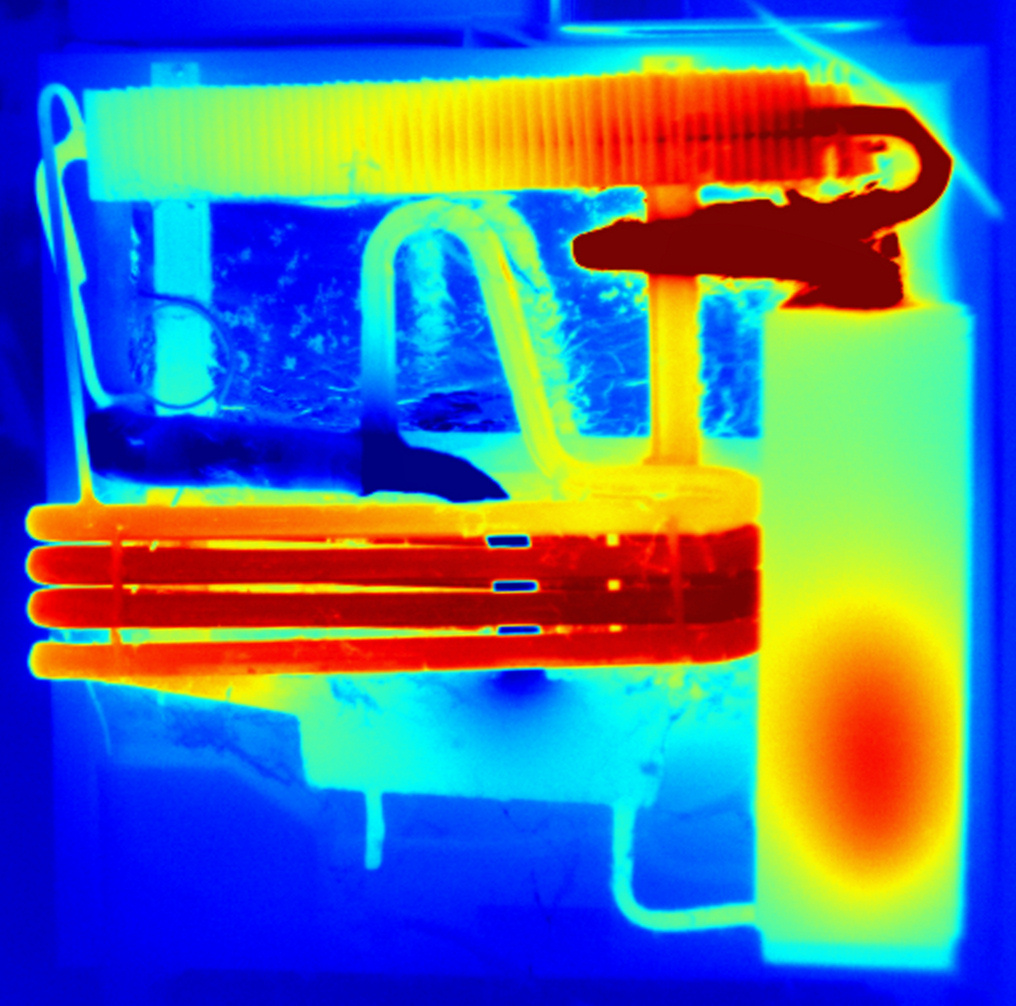
Thermal image of a Domestic absorption refrigerator of a comparable type to the one in the labelled image above. Colour indicates relative temperature: blue=cold, red is hottest. The heat source (7) is contained entirely within the insulation section (6).

A single-pressure absorption refrigerator takes advantage of the fact that a liquid's evaporation rate depends upon the partial pressure of the vapor above the liquid and goes up with lower partial pressure. While having the same total pressure throughout the system, the refrigerator maintains a low partial pressure of the refrigerant (therefore high evaporation rate) in the part of the system that draws heat out of the low-temperature interior of the refrigerator, but maintains the refrigerant at high partial pressure (therefore low evaporation rate) in the part of the system that expels heat to the ambient-temperature air outside the refrigerator.

The refrigerator uses three substances: ammonia, hydrogen gas, and water. The cycle is closed, with all hydrogen, water and ammonia collected and endlessly reused. The system is pressurized to raise the boiling point of ammonia higher than the temperature of the condenser coil (the coil which transfers heat to the air outside the refrigerator, by being hotter than the outside air.) This pressure is typically 14–16 standard atmospheres (1,400–1,600 kPa), putting the dew point of ammonia at about 35 °C (95 °F).

The cooling cycle starts with liquid ammonia at room temperature entering the evaporator. The volume of the evaporator is greater than the volume of the liquid, with the excess space occupied by a mixture of gaseous ammonia and hydrogen. The presence of hydrogen lowers the partial pressure of the ammonia gas, thus lowering the evaporation point of the liquid below the temperature of the refrigerator's interior. Ammonia evaporates, taking a small amount of heat from the liquid and lowering the liquid's temperature. It continues to evaporate, while the large enthalpy of vaporization (heat) flows from the warmer refrigerator interior to the cooler liquid ammonia and then to more ammonia gas.

In the next two steps, the ammonia gas is separated from the hydrogen so it can be reused.

1. The ammonia (gas) and hydrogen (gas) mixture flows through a pipe from the evaporator into the absorber. In the absorber, this mixture of gases contacts water (technically, a weak solution of ammonia in water). The gaseous ammonia dissolves in the water, while the hydrogen, which doesn't, collects at the top of the absorber, leaving the now-strong ammonia-and-water solution at the bottom. The hydrogen is now separate while the ammonia is now dissolved in the water.
2. The next step separates the ammonia and water. The ammonia/water solution flows to the generator (boiler), where heat is applied to boil off the ammonia, leaving most of the water (which has a higher boiling point) behind. Some water vapor and bubbles remain mixed with the ammonia; this water is removed in the final separation step, by passing it through the separator, an uphill series of twisted pipes with minor obstacles to pop the bubbles, allowing the water vapor to condense and drain back to the generator.

The pure ammonia gas then enters the condenser. In this heat exchanger, the hot ammonia gas transfers its heat to the outside air, which is below the boiling point of the full-pressure ammonia, and therefore condenses. The condensed (liquid) ammonia flows down to be mixed with the hydrogen gas released from the absorption step, repeating the cycle.

== See also ==
- Adsorption refrigeration
- Icyball
- Quantum absorption refrigerator
