= Applications of the Stirling engine =

Practical uses for Stirling engine technology

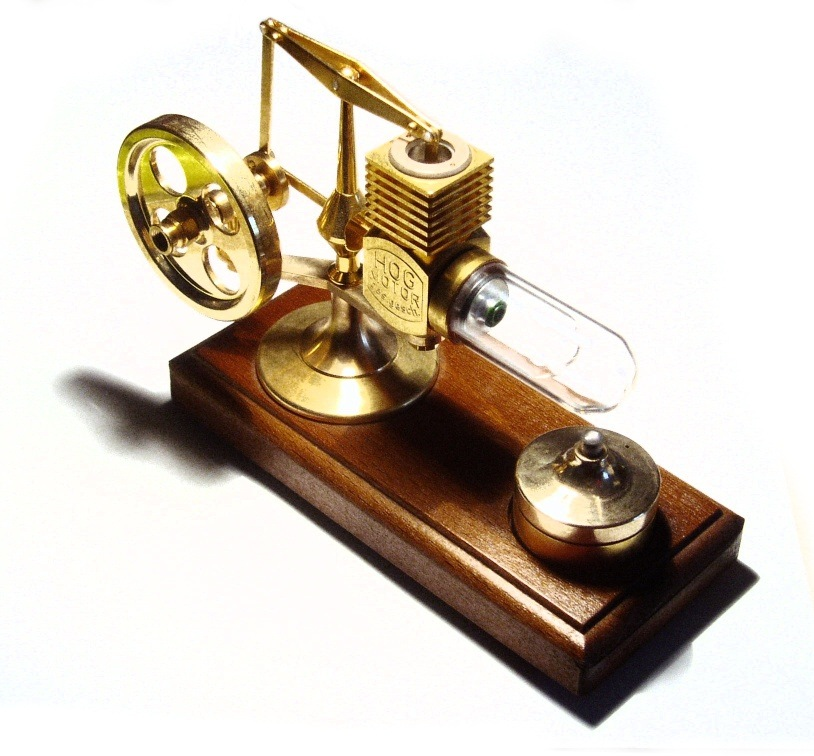
A desktop gamma Stirling engine. The working fluid in this engine is air. The hot heat exchange is the glass cylinder on the right, and the cold heat exchanger is the finned cylinder on the top. This engine uses a small alcohol burner (bottom right) as a heat source

Applications of the Stirling engine range from mechanical propulsion to heating and cooling to electrical generation systems. A Stirling engine is a heat engine operating by cyclic compression and expansion of air or other gas, the "working fluid", at different temperature levels such that there is a net conversion of heat to mechanical work. The Stirling cycle heat engine can also be driven in reverse, using a mechanical energy input to drive heat transfer in a reversed direction (i.e. a heat pump, or refrigerator).

There are several design configurations for Stirling engines that can be built (many of which require rotary or sliding seals) which can introduce difficult tradeoffs between frictional losses and refrigerant leakage. A free-piston variant of the Stirling engine can be built, which can be completely hermetically sealed, reducing friction losses and completely eliminating refrigerant leakage. For example, a free-piston Stirling cooler (FPSC) can convert an electrical energy input into a practical heat pump effect, used for high-efficiency portable refrigerators and freezers. Conversely, a free-piston electrical generator could be built, converting a heat flow into mechanical energy, and then into electricity. In both cases, energy is usually converted from/to electrical energy using magnetic fields in a way that avoids compromising the hermetic seal.

== Mechanical output and propulsion ==
=== Automotive engines ===
It is often claimed that the Stirling engine has too low a power/weight ratio, too high a cost, and too long a starting time for automotive applications. They also have complex and expensive heat exchangers. A Stirling cooler must reject twice as much heat as an Otto engine or diesel engine radiator. The heater must be made of stainless steel, exotic alloy, or ceramic to support high heating temperatures needed for high power density, and to contain hydrogen gas that is often used in automotive Stirlings to maximize power. The main difficulties involved in using the Stirling engine in an automotive application are startup time, acceleration response, shutdown time, and weight, not all of which have ready-made solutions.

However, a modified Stirling engine has been introduced that uses concepts taken from a patented internal-combustion engine with a sidewall combustion chamber (US patent 7,387,093) that promises to overcome the deficient power-density and specific-power problems, as well as the slow acceleration-response problem inherent in all Stirling engines. It could be possible to use these in co-generation systems that use waste heat from a conventional piston or gas turbine engine's exhaust and use this either to power the ancillaries (e.g.: the alternator) or even as a turbo-compound system that adds power and torque to the crankshaft.

Automobiles exclusively powered by Stirling engines were developed in test projects by NASA, as well as earlier projects by the Ford Motor Company using engines provided by Philips, and by American Motors Corporation (AMC) with several cars equipped with units from Sweden's United Stirling built under a license from Philips. The NASA vehicle test projects were designed by contractors and designated MOD I and MOD II.

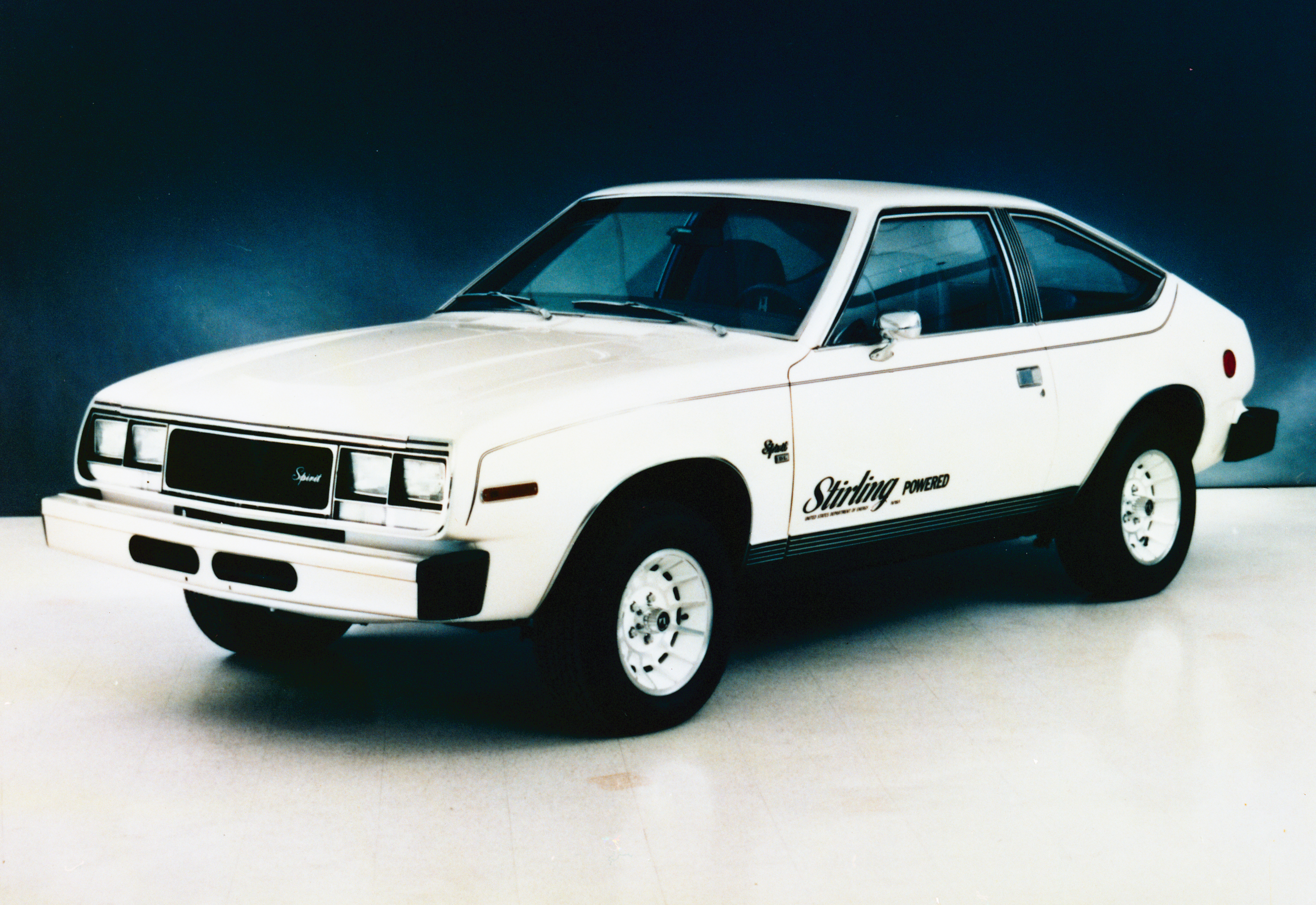
1979 DOE NASA AMC Spirit DL with a Stirling engine

NASA's Stirling MOD 1 powered engineering vehicles were built in partnership with the United States Department of Energy (DOE) and NASA, under contract by AMC's AM General to develop and demonstrate practical alternatives for standard engines. The United Stirling AB's P-40 powered AMC Spirit was tested extensively for over 50,000 miles (80,467 km) and achieved average fuel efficiency up to 28.5 mpg_{‑US} (8.3 L/100 km; 34.2 mpg_{‑imp}). A 1980 4-door liftback VAM Lerma was also converted to United Stirling P-40 power to demonstrate the Stirling engine to the public and to promote the U.S. government's alternative engine program.

Tests conducted with the 1979 AMC Spirit, as well as a 1977 Opel and a 1980 AMC Concord, revealed the Stirling engines "could be developed into an automotive powertrain for passenger vehicles and that it could produce favorable results." However, progress was achieved with equal-power spark-ignition engines since 1977, and the Corporate Average Fuel Economy (CAFE) requirements that were to be achieved by automobiles sold in the U.S. were being increased. Moreover, the Stirling engine design continued to exhibit a shortfall in fuel efficiency. There were also two major drawbacks for consumers using the Stirling engines: first was the time needed to warm up – because most drivers do not like to wait to start driving; and second was the difficulty in changing the engine's speed – thus limiting driving flexibility on the road and traffic. The process of auto manufacturers converting their existing facilities and tooling for the mass production of a completely new design and type of powerplant was also questioned.

The MOD II project in 1980 produced one of the most efficient automotive engines ever made. The engine reached a peak thermal efficiency of 38.5%, compared to a modern spark-ignition (gasoline) engine, which has a peak efficiency of 20–25%. The Mod II project replaced the normal spark-ignition engine in a 1985 4-door Chevrolet Celebrity notchback. In the 1986 MOD II Design Report (Appendix A) the results showed that highway gas mileage was increased from 40 to 58 mpg_{‑US} (5.9 to 4.1 L/100 km; 48 to 70 mpg_{‑imp}) and achieved an urban range of 26 to 33 mpg_{‑US} (9.0–7.1 L/100 km; 31–40 mpg_{‑imp}) with no change in vehicle gross weight. Startup time in the NASA vehicle was a maximum of 30 seconds, while Ford's research vehicle used an internal electric heater to quickly start the engine, giving a start time of only a few seconds. The high torque output of the Stirling engine at low speed eliminated the need for a torque converter in the transmission resulting in decreased weight and transmission drivetrain losses negating somewhat the weight disadvantage of the Stirling in auto use. This resulted in increased efficiencies being mentioned in the test results.

The experiments indicated that the Stirling engine could improve vehicle operational efficiency by ideally detaching the Stirling from direct power demands, eliminating a direct mechanical linkage as used in most current vehicles. Its prime function used in an extended-range series electric hybrid vehicle would be as a generator providing electricity to drive the electric vehicle traction motors and charging a buffer battery set. In a petro-hydraulic hybrid the Stirling would perform a similar function as in a petro-electric series-hybrid turning a pump charging a hydraulic buffer tank. Although successful in the MOD 1 and MOD 2 phases of the experiments, cutbacks in funding further research and lack of interest by automakers ended possible commercialization of the Automotive Stirling Engine Program.

=== Electric vehicles ===
Stirling engines as part of a hybrid electric drive system may be able to bypass the design challenges or disadvantages of a non-hybrid Stirling automobile.

In November 2007, a prototype hybrid car using solid biofuel and a Stirling engine was announced by the Precer project in Sweden.

The New Hampshire Union Leader reported that Dean Kamen developed a series plug-in hybrid car using a Ford Think. Called the DEKA Revolt, the car can reach approximately 60 miles (97 km) on a single charge of its lithium battery.

=== Aircraft engines ===
Robert McConaghy created the first flying Stirling engine-powered aircraft in August 1986. The Beta type engine weighed 360 grams, and produced only 20 watts of power. The engine was attached to the front of a modified Super Malibu radio control glider with a gross takeoff weight of 1 kg. The best-published test flight lasted 6 minutes and exhibited "barely enough power to make the occasional gentle turn and maintain altitude".

=== Marine engines ===
The Stirling engine could be well suited for underwater power systems where electrical work or mechanical power is required on an intermittent or continuous level. General Motors has undertaken work on advanced Stirling cycle engines which include thermal storage for underwater applications. United Stirling, in Malmö, Sweden, are developing an experimental four–cylinder engine using hydrogen peroxide as an oxidant in underwater power systems. The SAGA (Submarine Assistance Great Autonomy) submarine became operational in the 1990s and is driven by two Stirling engines supplied with diesel fuel and liquid oxygen. This system also has potential for surface-ship propulsion, as the engine's size is less of a concern, and placing the radiator section in seawater rather than open air (as a land-based engine would be) allows for it to be smaller.

Swedish shipbuilder Kockums has built eight successful Stirling-powered submarines since the late 1980s. They carry compressed oxygen to allow fuel combustion submerged, providing heat for the Stirling engine. They are currently used on submarines of the Gotland and Södermanland classes. They are the first submarines in the world to feature Stirling air-independent propulsion (AIP), which extends their underwater endurance from a few days to several weeks.

The Kockums engine also powers the Japanese Sōryū-class submarine.

This capability has previously only been available with nuclear-powered submarines.

=== Pump engines ===
Stirling engines can power pumps to move fluids like water, air and gasses. For instance the ST-5 from Stirling Technology Inc. power output of 5 horsepower (3.7 kW) that can run a 3 kW generator or a centrifugal water pump.

== Electrical power generation ==
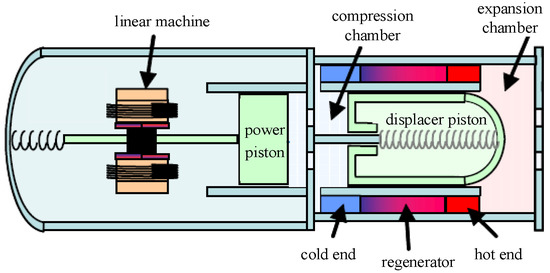
Structural schematic diagram of a Free Piston Stirling Engine system

=== Combined heat and power ===
In a combined heat and power (CHP) system, mechanical or electrical power is generated in the usual way, however, the waste heat given off by the engine is used to supply a secondary heating application. This can be virtually anything that uses low-temperature heat. It is often a pre-existing energy use, such as commercial space heating, residential water heating, or an industrial process.

Thermal power stations on the electric grid use fuel to produce electricity. However, there are large quantities of waste heat produced which often go unused. In other situations, high-grade fuel is burned at high temperatures for a low-temperature application. According to the second law of thermodynamics, a heat engine can generate power from this temperature difference. In a CHP system, the high-temperature primary heat enters the Stirling engine heater, then some of the energy is converted to mechanical power in the engine, and the rest passes through to the cooler, where it exits at a low temperature. The "waste" heat actually comes from the engine's main cooler, and possibly from other sources such as the exhaust of the burner, if there is one.

The power produced by the engine can be used to run an industrial or agricultural process, which in turn creates biomass waste refuse that can be used as free fuel for the engine, thus reducing waste removal costs. The overall process can be efficient and cost-effective.

Inspirit Energy, a UK-based company have a gas fired CHP unit called the Inspirit Charger which is on sale in 2016. The floor standing unit generates 3 kW of electrical and 15 kW of thermal energy.

WhisperGen, a New Zealand firm with offices in Christchurch, has developed an "AC Micro Combined Heat and Power" Stirling cycle engine. These microCHP units are gas-fired central heating boilers that sell unused power back into the electricity grid. WhisperGen announced in 2004 that they were producing 80,000 units for the residential market in the United Kingdom. A 20 unit trial in Germany was conducted in 2006.

=== Solar power generation ===
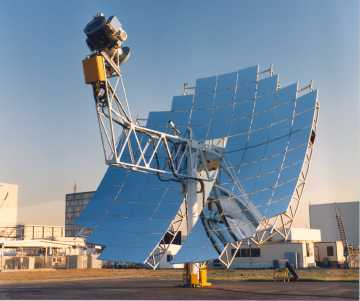
Dish Stirling from SES

Placed at the focus of a parabolic mirror, a Stirling engine can convert solar energy to electricity with an efficiency better than non-concentrated photovoltaic cells, and comparable to concentrated photovoltaics. On August 11, 2005, Southern California Edison announced an agreement with Stirling Energy Systems (SES) to purchase electricity created using over 30,000 Solar Powered Stirling Engines over a twenty-year period sufficient to generate 850 MW of electricity. These systems, on an 8,000 acre (19 km^{2}) solar farm will use mirrors to direct and concentrate sunlight onto the engines which will in turn drive generators. "In January, 2010, four months after breaking ground, Stirling Energy partner company Tessara Solar completed the 1.5 MW Maricopa Solar power plant in Peoria, Arizona, just outside Phoenix. The power plant is composed of 60 SES SunCatchers." The SunCatcher is described as "a large, tracking, concentrating solar power (CSP) dish collector that generates 25 kilowatts (kW) of electricity in full sun. Each of the 38-foot-diameter collectors contains over 300 curved mirrors (heliostats) that focus sunlight onto a power conversion unit, which contains the Stirling engine. The dish uses dual-axis tracking to follow the sun precisely as it moves across the sky." There have been disputes over the project due to concerns of environmental impact on animals living on the site. The Maricopa Solar Plant has been closed.

=== Nuclear power ===
There is a potential for nuclear-powered Stirling engines in electric power generation plants. Replacing the steam turbines of nuclear power plants with Stirling engines might simplify the plant, yield greater efficiency, and reduce the radioactive byproducts. A number of breeder reactor designs use liquid sodium as a coolant. If the heat is to be employed in a steam plant, a water/sodium heat exchanger is required, which raises some concern if a leak were to occur, as sodium reacts violently with water. A Stirling engine eliminates the need for water anywhere in the cycle. This would have advantages for nuclear installations in dry regions.

United States government labs have developed a modern Stirling engine design known as the Stirling radioisotope generator for use in space exploration. It is designed to generate electricity for deep space probes on missions lasting decades. The engine uses a single displacer to reduce moving parts and uses high energy acoustics to transfer energy. The heat source is a dry solid nuclear fuel slug, and the heat sink is radiation into free space itself.

== Heating and cooling ==
If supplied with mechanical power, a Stirling engine can function in reverse as a heat pump for heating or cooling. In the late 1930s, the Philips Corporation of the Netherlands successfully utilized the Stirling cycle in cryogenic applications. During the Space Shuttle program, NASA successfully lofted a Stirling cycle cooler in a form "similar in size and shape to the small domestic units often used in college dormitories" for use in the Life Science Laboratory. Further research on this unit for domestic use led to a Carnot coefficient-of-performance gain by a factor of three and a weight reduction of 1kg for the unit. Experiments have been performed using wind power driving a Stirling cycle heat pump for domestic heating and air conditioning.

=== Stirling cryocoolers ===
Any Stirling engine will also work in reverse as a heat pump: when mechanical energy is applied to the shaft, a temperature difference appears between the reservoirs. The essential mechanical components of a Stirling cryocooler are identical to a Stirling engine. In both the engine and the heat pump, heat flows from the expansion space to the compression space; however, input work is required in order for heat to flow "uphill" against a thermal gradient, specifically when the compression space is hotter than the expansion space. The external side of the expansion-space heat exchanger may be placed inside a thermally insulated compartment such as a vacuum flask. Heat is in effect pumped out of this compartment, through the working gas of the cryocooler and into the compression space. The compression space will be above ambient temperature, and so heat will flow out into the environment.

One of their modern uses is in cryogenics and, to a lesser extent, refrigeration. At typical refrigeration temperatures, Stirling coolers are generally not economically competitive with the less expensive mainstream Rankine cooling systems, because they are less energy-efficient. However, below about −40...−30 °C, Rankine cooling is not effective because there are no suitable refrigerants with boiling points this low. Stirling cryocoolers are able to "lift" heat down to −200 °C (73 K), which is sufficient to liquefy air (specifically the primary constituent gases oxygen, nitrogen and argon). They can go as low as 40–60 K for single-stage machines, depending on the particular design. Two-stage Stirling cryocoolers can reach temperatures of 20 K, sufficient to liquify hydrogen and neon. Cryocoolers for this purpose are more or less competitive with other cryocooler technologies. The coefficient of performance at cryogenic temperatures is typically 0.04–0.05 (corresponding to a 4–5% efficiency). Empirically, the devices show a linear trend, typically with the COP = 0.0015 T_{c} − 0.065, where T_{c} is the cryogenic temperature. At these temperatures, solid materials have lower specific heat values, so the regenerator must be made from unexpected materials, such as cotton.

The first Stirling-cycle cryocooler was developed at Philips in the 1950s and commercialized in such places as liquid air production plants. The Philips Cryogenics business evolved until it was split off in 1990 to form the Stirling Cryogenics BV, The Netherlands. This company is still active in the development and manufacturing of Stirling cryocoolers and cryogenic cooling systems.

A wide variety of smaller Stirling cryocoolers are commercially available for tasks such as the cooling of electronic sensors and sometimes microprocessors. For this application, Stirling cryocoolers are the highest-performance technology available, due to their ability to lift heat efficiently at very low temperatures. They are silent, vibration-free, can be scaled down to small sizes, and have very high reliability and low maintenance. As of 2009, cryocoolers were considered to be the only widely deployed commercially successful Stirling devices.

=== Heat pumps ===
A Stirling heat pump is very similar to a Stirling cryocooler, the main difference being that it usually operates at room temperature. At present, its principal application is to pump heat from the outside of a building to the inside, thus heating it at lowered energy costs.

As with any other Stirling device, heat flow is from the expansion space to the compression space. However, in contrast to the Stirling engine, the expansion space is at a lower temperature than the compression space, so instead of producing work, an input of mechanical work is required by the system (in order to satisfy the second law of thermodynamics). The mechanical energy input can be supplied by an electrical motor, or an internal combustion engine, for example. When the mechanical work for the heat pump is provided by a second Stirling engine, then the overall system is called a "heat-driven heatpump".

The expansion side of the heat pump is thermally coupled to the heat source, which is often the external environment. The compression side of the Stirling device is placed in the environment to be heated, for example, a building, and heat is "pumped" into it. Typically there will be thermal insulation between the two sides so there will be a temperature rise inside the insulated space.

Heat pumps are by far the most energy-efficient types of heating systems, since they "harvest" heat from the environment, rather than only turning their input energy into heat. In accordance with the second law of thermodynamics, heat pumps always require the additional input of some external energy to "pump" the collected heat "uphill" against a temperature differential.

Compared to conventional heat pumps, Stirling heat pumps often have a higher coefficient of performance. Stirling systems have seen limited commercial use; however, use is expected to increase along with market demand for energy conservation, and adoption will likely be accelerated by technological refinements.

=== Portable refrigeration ===
The free-piston Stirling cooler (FPSC) is a completely sealed heat transfer system that has only two moving parts (a piston and a displacer), and which can use helium as the working fluid. The piston is typically driven by an oscillating magnetic field that is the source of the power needed to drive the refrigeration cycle. The magnetic drive allows the piston to be driven without requiring any seals, gaskets, O-rings, or other compromises to the hermetically sealed system. Claimed advantages for the system include improved efficiency and cooling capacity, lighter weight, smaller size and better controllability.

The FPSC was invented in 1964 by William Beale (1928–2016), a professor of mechanical engineering at Ohio University in Athens, Ohio. He founded Sunpower Inc., which researches and develops FPSC systems for military, aerospace, industrial, and commercial applications. A FPSC cooler made by Sunpower was used by NASA to cool instrumentation in satellites. The firm was sold by the Beale family in 2015 to become a unit of Ametek.

Other suppliers of FPSC technology include the Twinbird Corporation of Japan and Global Cooling of the Netherlands, which (like Sunpower) has a research center in Athens, Ohio.

For several years starting around 2004, the Coleman Company sold a version of the Twinbird "SC-C925 Portable Freezer Cooler 25L" under its own brand name, but it has since discontinued offering the product. The portable cooler can be operated more than a day, maintaining sub-freezing temperatures while powered by an automotive battery. This cooler is still being manufactured, with Global Cooling now coordinating distribution to North America and Europe. Other variants offered by Twinbird include a portable deep freezer (to −80 °C), collapsible coolers, and a model for transporting blood and vaccine.

== Low temperature difference engines ==
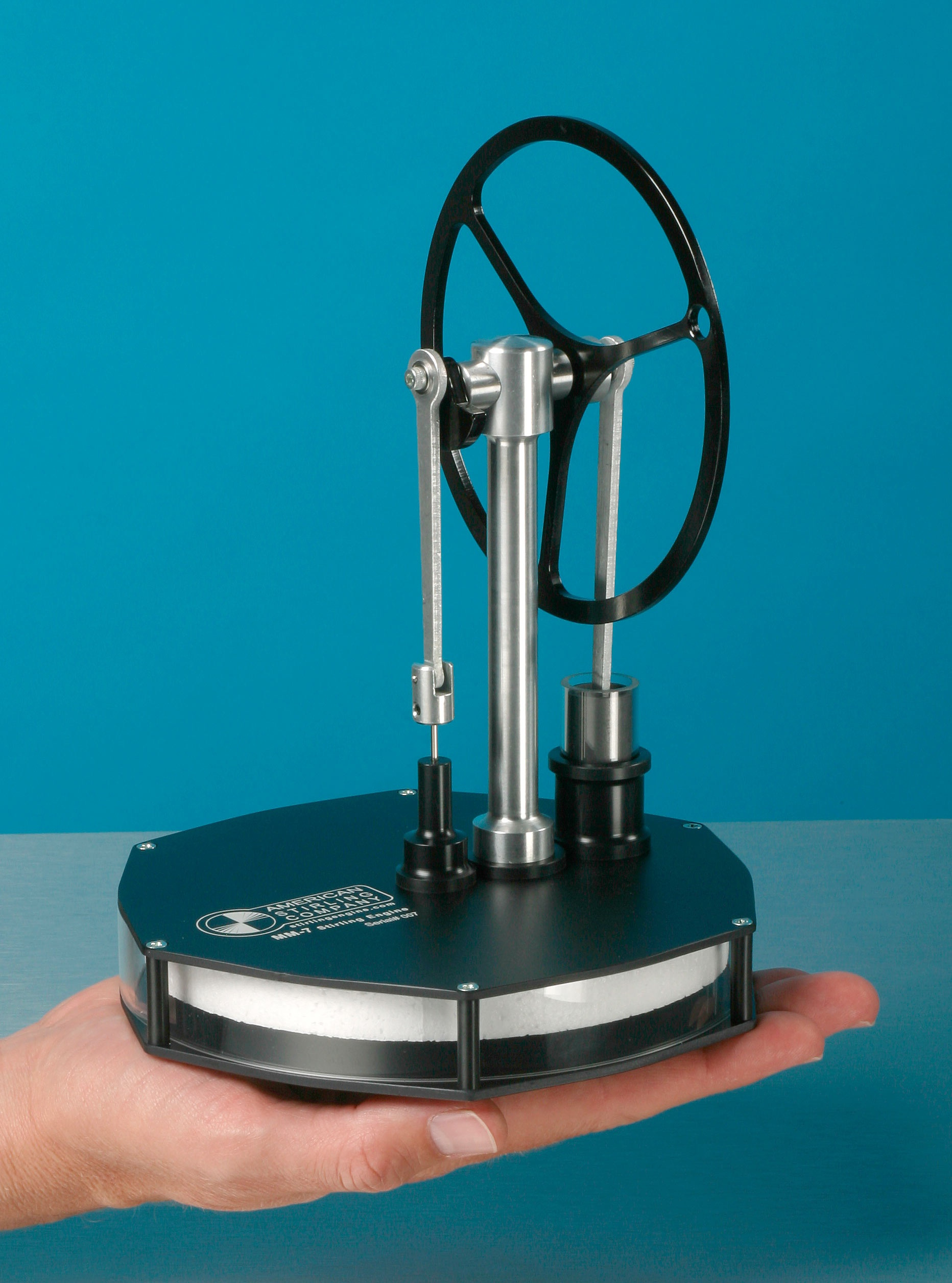
A low-temperature-difference Stirling engine, shown here running on the heat from a warm hand

A low temperature difference (LTD, or Low Delta T (LDT)) Stirling engine will run on any low-temperature differential, for example, the difference between the palm of a hand and room temperature, or room temperature and an ice cube. A record of only 0.5 °C temperature differential was achieved in 1990. Usually they are designed in a gamma configuration for simplicity, and without a regenerator, although some have slits in the displacer typically made of foam for partial regeneration. They are typically unpressurized, running at pressure close to 1 atmosphere. The power produced is less than 1 W, and they are intended for demonstration purposes only. They are sold as toys and educational models.

However, larger (typically 1 m square) low temperature engines have been built for pumping water using direct sunlight with minimal or no magnification.

== Other applications ==
=== Acoustic Stirling Heat Engine ===
Los Alamos National Laboratory has developed an "Acoustic Stirling Heat Engine" with no moving parts. It converts heat into intense acoustic power which (quoted from given source) "can be used directly in acoustic refrigerators or pulse-tube refrigerators to provide heat-driven refrigeration with no moving parts, or ... to generate electricity via a linear alternator or other electro-acoustic power transducer".

=== MicroCHP ===
WhisperGen, (bankruptcy 2012) a New Zealand-based company has developed Stirling engines that can be powered by natural gas or diesel. An agreement has been signed with Mondragon Corporación Cooperativa, a Spanish firm, to produce WhisperGen's microCHP (Combined Heat and Power) and make them available for the domestic market in Europe. Some time ago E.ON UK announced a similar initiative for the UK. Domestic Stirling engines would supply the client with hot water, space heating, and a surplus electric power that could be fed back into the electric grid.

Based on the companies' published performance specifications, the off-grid diesel-fueled unit produces combined heat (5.5 kW heat) and electric (800W electric) output, from a unit being fed 0.75 liters of automotive-grade diesel fuel per hour. Whispergen units are claimed to operate as a combined co-generation unit reaching as high as ~80% operating efficiency.

However the preliminary results of an Energy Saving Trust review of the performance of the WhisperGen microCHP units suggested that their advantages were marginal at best in most homes. However another author shows that Stirling engine microgeneration is the most cost effective of various microgeneration technologies in terms of reducing CO_{2}.

=== Chip cooling ===
MSI (Taiwan) developed a miniature Stirling engine cooling system for personal computer chips that uses the waste heat from the chip to drive a fan.

=== Desalination ===
In all thermal power plants there has to be an exhaust of waste heat. However, there's no reason that the waste heat cannot be diverted to run Stirling engines to pump seawater through reverse osmosis assemblies except that any additional use of the heat raises the effective heat sink temperature for the thermal power plant resulting in some loss of energy conversion efficiency. In a typical nuclear power plant, two-thirds of the thermal energy produced by the reactor is waste heat. In a Stirling assembly the waste heat has the potential to be used as an additional source of electricity.
