= Carl Munters =

Swedish inventor (1897–1989)

Carl Georg Munters
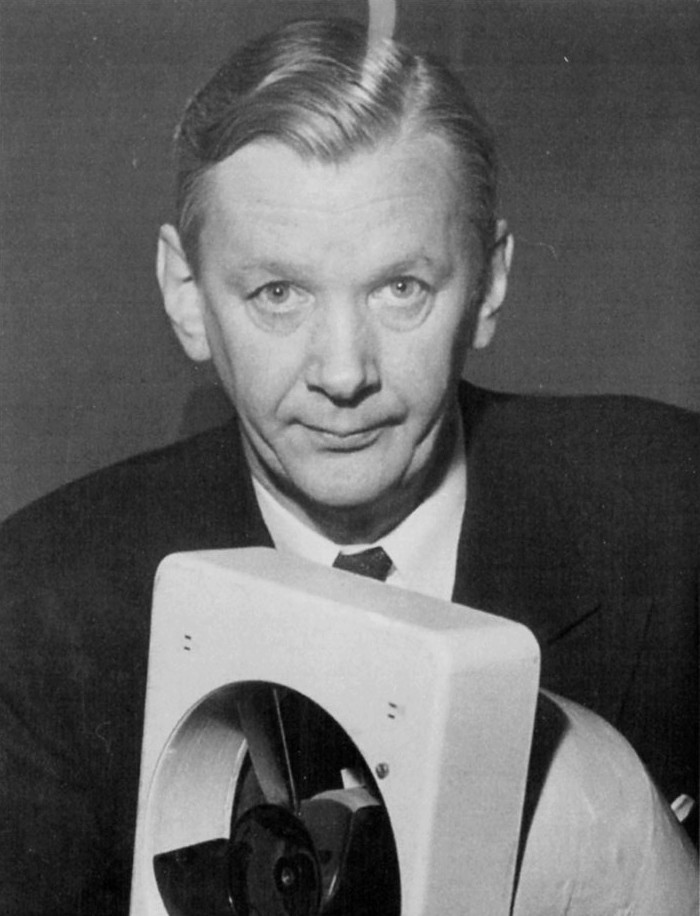
- Born: 22 March 1897; Dala-Järna, Kopparbergs län, Sweden
- Died: 1989; Sweden

Carl Georg Munters (22 March 1897 – 1989) was a Swedish inventor, most known for inventing together with Baltzar von Platen the gas absorption refrigerator now sold by Electrolux. He also invented and patented a method of making foamed plastic, which was later rediscovered by Dow Chemical Company and used to make Styrofoam.

== Personal life ==
He was born in Dala-Järna, Kopparbergs län, Sweden, the son of engineer Anders Johan Munters and Hilma Bernhardina Helling. He graduated from KTH in 1922. Munters married Anna Eugenia Geralf in 1925 and Marianne Warkander in 1951.

== Refrigerators ==
Together with Baltzar von Platen and John Tandberg, Munters invented the gas absorption refrigerator for domestic use. His intention was to create an easy-to-use refrigerator without any moving parts. The technique removed thermal energy, which was driven by a heat source such as propane, electricity, or kerosene. The team rented a room and worked into the night. They slept in the mornings and missed classes at the Royal Institute of Technology where they were students. It took them about a year to create a first prototype that worked with self-circulation. The prototype still had one moving part, a ball valve, and was big and clumsy. Eventually the design was improved and their cooling solution was a world sensation. Albert Einstein once mentioned how astonished he was by their ingenious solution.

Manufacturing of the refrigerator commenced in 1923 by the company AB Arctic. In 1925, development was finished, and the company was bought by Electrolux.

== Other inventions ==
After inventing extruded polystyrene foam plastic in early 1930s and selling his US patent to Dow in 1940s, he started his own company in 1955 and developed, among other things, new insulation materials, air conditioners and dehumidification devices. At his death, Munters had over a thousand patents.

=== Patents ===
- US 4002040, Carl Munters, "Method of cooling air and apparatus intended therefor"
- US 4152901, CG Munters, "Method and apparatus for transferring energy in an absorption heating and cooling system"
