= Timeline of culinary technologies =

This is a timeline of culinary technologies.

== Timeline of culinary technologies ==
Earliest attested dates, inventors, or locations, for culinary technologies.

- 3,000,000 BP – Stone tools, through the Millstone, Metate & Mano, and Quern-stone.
- 780,000 BP – Cooking – see: Control of fire by early humans.
- 250,000 BP – hearths.
- 22,500 BP – Fish hook – Okinawa Island, Japan.
- 18,300 BP – Pottery – Xianrendong and Yuchanyan caves, China.
- 6600 BC – Clay oven – Çatalhöyük, Turkey.
- 6600–6000 BC – Spoon, Turkey.
- 6500–5500 BC – Butter churn – Beersheba culture, Negev, Israel.
- 6400–5900 BC – Non-Stick Husking Tray – Mesopotamia.
- 6000 BC – Copper knife – Old Copper complex, North America.
- 5000–4000 BC – Food steamer (yan) – Banpo culture, China.
- 3500–3300 BC – Beaten and riveted copper alloy cauldrons – Maykop culture, Caucasus.
- 2800 BC – Soap and Lye – Babylon (Iraq).
- 2600 BC – Barrel – Egypt.
- 2500 BC – Wine cork – Egypt.
- 1900–1500 BC – Ding (cast bronze cauldron) – Erlitou culture, China.
- 1766–1122 BC – Chopsticks – Shang dynasty, China.
- 1766–1122 BC – Fork- Shang dynasty, China or Mycenaean Greece.
- 1700 BC – Cookbook – Akkadian tablets.
- 1500 BC – Glass bottle – Mesopotamia.
- 1000 BC – Ash glazeware – Shang dynasty, China.
- 750 BC – Cast iron cookware – China.
- 700 BC – Grater – Greece.
- 5th–4th century BC – Bain-marie – Greece.
- 4th–3rd century BC – Flour producing Watermills – Turkey / Iran.
- 210 BC – Kitchen stove – Qin dynasty, China.
- c.206 BC – Tea strainer – Han dynasty, China.
- 70 AD – Gridiron (craticula) - Pompeii, Italy.
- 5th century – Fireplace fireback – China.
- 7th–9th century – Panemone windmill – Iran.
- 12th century – Waffle Iron – France.
- 13 Jun 1475 – First Printed Cookbook: "De honesta voluptate et valetudine" – Bartolomeo Platina, Italy.
- 15th century – Greensand cast, brass, cookware (Dinanderie) – Meuse Valley, Low Countries.
- 1633 – Glass onion wine bottle – Kenelm Digby and James Howell, UK.
- 1679 – Pressure cooker – Denis Papin, UK.
- 1681 – Corkscrew – UK.
- 18th century – Larkspit / Bar-Grate Toaster / Wire toasting frame – UK.
- 1707 – Green sand, thin walled, Cast iron Cookware – patented Abraham Darby I, UK.
- 1720s – Mustard flour / powder mill – Mrs Clements, Durham, UK.
- 1764 – Vitreous enamel (coated cast iron pots) – Königsbronn, Germany.
- 1770s – Carbonated water (Soda water) – William Brownrigg, Henry Cavendish, Joseph Priestley, and Johann Jacob Schweppe, UK.
- 1772 – Canned food – Dutch Navy, Netherlands.
- 1782–89 – Coffee filter (blotting paper in a metal cone) – Johann Georg Krünitz, Germany.
- 1786 – Threshing machine – Andrew Meikle, UK.
- 1795 – Drip coffee – François-Antoine-Henri Descroizilles, France.
- 1795–1805 – Cast Iron Kitchen stove (Rumford roaster) – Benjamin Thompson, Count Rumford, UK.
- 1799 – Coffee grinder – Richard Dearmann, UK.
- 1813 – Early coffee percolator maker – Benjamin Thompson, Count Rumford, UK.
- 1817 – Cardboard carton (Paperboard) – UK.
- 1819 – Coffee percolator – Joseph-Henry-Marie Laurens, France.
- 1820 – Pastry bag – Marie-Antoine Carême, France.
- 1826 – Gas Stove – patented James Sharp, UK.
- 1830s – Wire Whisk – France.
- 1833 – Coal fueled Kitchen stove – Jordan Mott, US.
- 1834 – Icemaker – Jacob Perkins, UK.
- 1842 – Pepper mill – Peugeot, France.
- 1843 – Baking powder – Alfred Bird, UK.
- 1845 – High pressure water Taps – Edward Chrimes, UK.
- 1847 – Parchment paper – Jean-André Poumarède and Louis Figuier, France.
- 1850s – Plumbed Kitchen Sink – UK.
- 1850 – Hand cranked Dishwasher – patented Joel Houghton, US.
- 1853 – Dijon mustard mill – patented Maurice Grey, France.
- 1855 – Can opener – patented Robert Yeates, UK.
- 1856 – Hand mixer – patented Ralph Collier, US.
- 1858 – Screw-capped glass Mason Jar – patented John Landis Mason, US.
- 1859 – Electric Kitchen stove – patented George B. Simpson, US.
- 1859 – Rotary egg beater – patented J.F. and E.P. Monroe, US.
- 1861 – Rice polisher – patented Sampson Moore, UK.
- 1860s – Curd cutter and Press (Cheddar process) – Joseph Harding, UK.
- 1879 – Hand pumped, vacuum, milking – patented Anna Baldwin, USA.
- 1884 – Espresso machine – patented Angelo Moriondo, Italy.
- 1885 – Popcorn maker – Charles Cretors, US.
- 1885 – Electric mixer – patented Rufus Eastman, US.
- 1885 – Rice huller – Evaristo Conrado Engelberg, Brazil.
- 1887 – Electric water boiler – induction heater, patented Ferranti, UK.
- 1880s – Primus stove – patented Frans Wilhelm Lindqvist, Sweden.
- 1890–91 – Electric Kettle – UK / US.
- 1892 – Vacuum Flask – James Dewar, UK.
- 1893 – Electric Toaster – Crompton & Company, UK.
- 1894 – Aluminium cookware – Wagner Manufacturing Company, US.
- 1894 – Centrifugal Milk Separator – patented Gustaf de Laval, Sweden.
- 1897 – Electric Oven – patented Thomas Ahearn, Canada.
- 1903 – Tea bag – patented Roberta Lawson and Mary McLaren, US.
- 1904 – Paper plate – patented Mouritz P. Toepfer, US.
- 1906 – Induction Stove – patented Arthur F. Berry, UK.
- 1906 – Cardboard Egg carton – Thomas Peter Bethell, UK.
- 1908 – Paper Coffee filter – patented Melitta Bentz, Germany.
- 1910 – Aluminium foil – Dr. Lauber, Neher & Cie, Switzerland.
- 1912 – Egg slicer – patented Willy Abel, Germany.
- 1913–15 – Residential refrigerators (DOMELRE) – Frederick William Wolf Jr., US.
- 1913–15 – Martensitic stainless steel cutlery and cookware – Harry Brearley, Sheffield, UK.
- 1915 – Jena glass / Pyrex Borosilicate glassware – Otto Schott, Germany.
- 1917 – Modern Automatic milking – Norman Daysh, New Zealand.
- 1921 – Popup toaster – patented Charles Perkins Strite, US.
- 1922 – Thermostat controlled oven – Radiation Ltd, UK.
- 1922 – Blender – patented Stephen Poplawski, US.
- 1923 – Electric Rice Cooker – Mitsubishi Electric, Japan.
- 1923 – Flash freezing – Clarence Birdseye, US.
- 1924 – Pie iron sandwich toaster – patented Charles V. Champion, US.
- 1926 – Kitchen hood (Extractor Hood) – patented Theodore R. N. Gerdes, US.
- 1927 – Automatic Bread Slicer – patented Otto Frederick Rohwedder, US.
- 1928 – Food mill – Victor Simon, Belgium.
- 1929 – Electric Dishwasher – Miele, Germany.
- 1937 – Televised cookery show (Cook's Night Out) – Marcel Boulestin, BBC, UK.
- 1938 – Tupperware containers – Earl Tupper, US.
- 1939 – bi-metallic Meat thermometer – George E Ford, Rochester Manufacturing Co. Inc, US.
- 1940s – Vacuum packing – US.
- 1945 – Convection oven (Fan assisted) – W. L. Maxson, US.
- 1946 – Food Processor – Starmix, Germany.
- 1947 – Microwave oven – patented by Percy LaBaron Spencer, US.
- 1949 – Preformed Aluminium Tray / Carton – Albert and Meyer Bernstein, US.
- 1949 – Frozen ready meal – Albert and Meyer Bernstein, US.
- 1949 – Plastic wrap (Saran) – patented Ralph Wiley, Dow Chemicals, US.
- 1955 – Automatic Kettle – Russell Hobbs, UK.
- 1955 – Automatic Rice Cooker – Toshiba, Japan.
- 1956 – Non-Stick TEFlon pans – Tefal / Marc Grégoire, France or Fissler, Germany.
- 1958–1962 – Stay-On and Ring-Pull aluminium Drink can – patented Anthony Bajada, and Ermal C. Fraze, US.
- 1960s – Maryse rubber coated "pot licker" Spatula – de Buyer, France.
- 1963 – Domestic Vacuum sealer – Karl Busch, Germany.
- 1965 – Silicone baking mat – Guy Demarle, France.
- 1963–69 – Tetra Brik Aseptic, plastic coated paper liquids carton – Erik Wallenberg and Ruben Rausing, Sweden.
- 1972 – Consumer, Cool Top 2, Induction stove – Bill Moreland and Terry Malarkey, Westinghouse, US.
- 1973 – PET (plastic) drinks bottle – patented Nathaniel Wyeth, DuPont, US.
- 2007 – Non-stick Silicone dioxide coated cookware – Greenpan Thermolon™ – The Cookware Company, Belgium.
- 2008 – Non-Stick Silicone coated cookware – AkzoNobel + Tramontina, Netherlands / Brazil.
- 2010 – Air fryer – Fred Van der Weij's, Netherlands.

== See also ==
- Timeline of food
- Kitchenware
- List of cooking appliances
- List of cooking vessels
