= Direct cool =

Direct cool is one of the two major types of techniques used in domestic refrigerators, the other being the "frost-free" type. Direct-cool refrigerators produce the cooling effect by a natural convection process from cooled surfaces in the insulated compartment that is being cooled. Water vapor that contacts the cooled surface freezes. Therefore, unlike frost-free units, direct-cool units require manual defrosting of the interior. Direct cool is less expensive in production and in operation, as it consumes less energy when compared to frost free refrigerators
