= Defrosting =

Defrosting or defroster may refer to:

- Defrosting (refrigeration)
- Frozen food § Defrosting
- De-icing
- Defogger
