= Frost free =

Frost free can refer to any of the following:

- Auto-defrost, a technique for refrigerators;
- A climate that is free of frost
- Certain bibcocks (sillcocks);
- The Frost Free Library in Marlborough, New Hampshire
