= Defrosting (refrigeration) =

Removal of frost and ice from a refrigerator

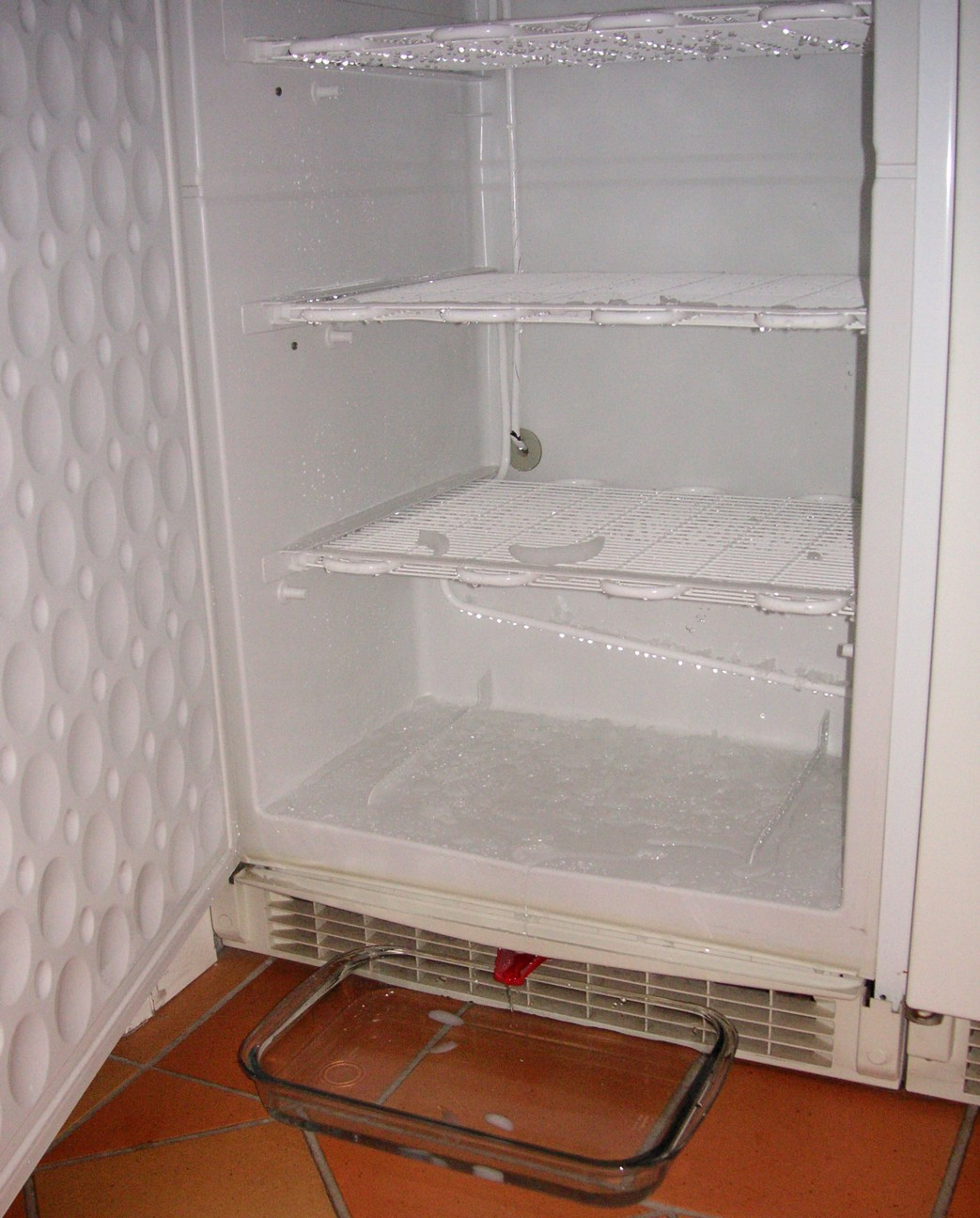
Defrosting a freezer with an improvised water collection method

In refrigerators, defrosting (or thawing) is the removal of frost and ice.

A defrosting procedure is generally performed periodically on refrigerators and freezers to maintain their operating efficiency. Over time, as the door is opened and closed, letting in new air, water vapour from the air condenses on the cooling elements within the cabinet.

Types of frost (in various environments) include crystalline frost (hoar frost or radiation frost) from deposition of water vapor from air of low humidity, white frost in humid conditions, window frost on glass surfaces, advection frost from cold wind over cold surfaces, black frost without visible ice at low temperatures and very low humidity, and rime under supercooled wet conditions.

The resulting ice inhibits heat transfer out of the cabinet increasing running costs. Furthermore, as the ice builds up it takes increasing space from within the cabinet - reducing the space available for food storage.

Many newer units employ automatic defrosting (often called "frost-free" or "no frost") and do not require manual defrosting in normal use. Although, in some cases, users of Frost Free fridge/freezers have noted ice blocking the vent that allows air into the refrigerator compartment.
