= DOMELRE =

First domestic electrical refrigerator

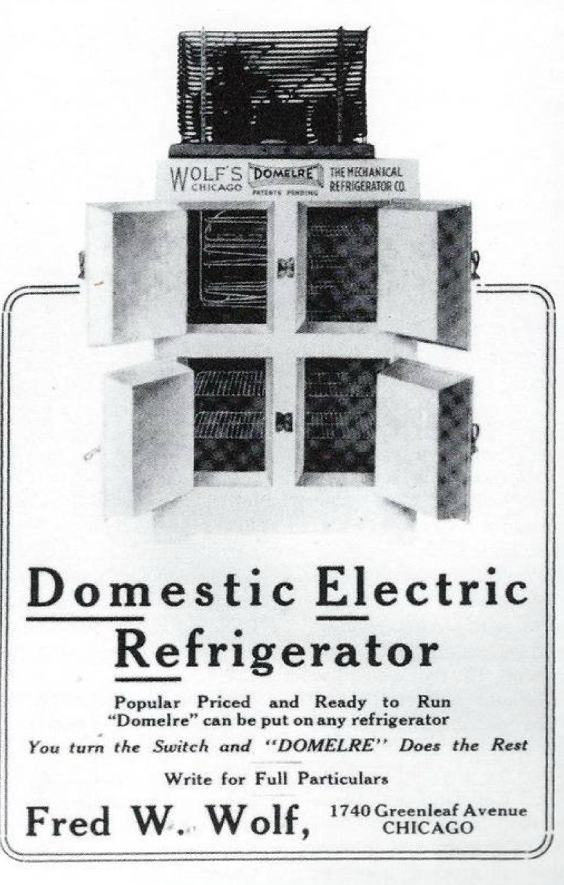
DOMELRE refrigerator advertisement from 1914

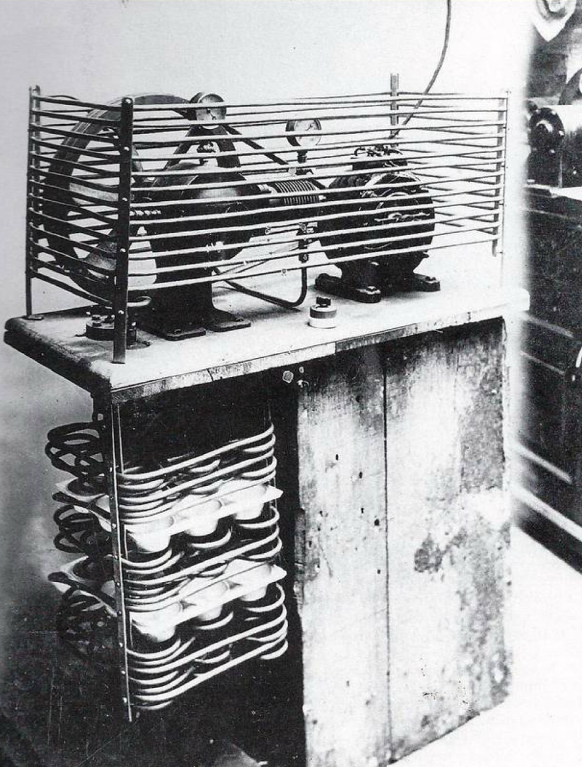
DOMELRE refrigerator c. 1914

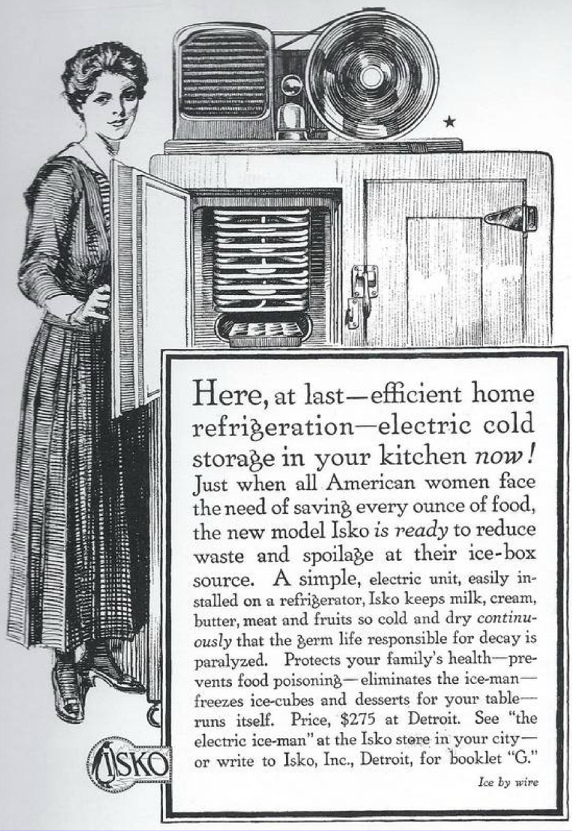
ISKO advertisement from Good Housekeeping 1917

DOMELRE (an acronym of Domestic Electric Refrigerator) was one of the first domestic electrical refrigerators, invented by Frederick William Wolf Jr. (1879–1954) in 1913 and produced starting in 1914 by Wolf's Mechanical Refrigerator Company in Chicago. Several hundred units were sold, which made it the most commercially successful product out of several competing designs of its time. The unit replaced the block of ice in the icebox with an electrical-powered cooling device, and was completely automatic.

Often labelled as the "first electrical refrigerator" or similar, It has been described as "revolutionary" in the history of domestic refrigeration.

== History ==
DOLMERE was invented by Frederick William Wolf Jr. (American engineer also known as Fred W. Wolf Jr., 1879-1954), a charter member of the American Society of Refrigerating Engineers, in 1913. An estimated several hundred to thousands of units were produced starting in 1914 by his Mechanical Refrigerator Company in Chicago. Fred Heideman was also involved in the unit's design. In 1916 Wolf sold the rights to the invention to Henry Joy, president of Packard Motor Car Company in Detroit, which released an upgraded version under the name ISKO. Having sold about a thousand more models, Joy's company nonetheless went bankrupt in 1922.

Commercially, DOMELRE was described as "a quick hit". The unit was considered relatively inexpensive for its time. The original model was sold for $900 ($24,450 in 2021 dollars); the 1916 model was priced at $385 in 1916 ($9,600 in 2021 dollars), later dropping to $275 ($6,850 in 2021 dollars). 525 were sold.

== Significance ==
DOMELRE has been described as "revolutionary" in the history of domestic refrigeration. It has been described as the "first domestic refrigerator", the "first household refrigerator", the "first electrical refrigerator", the "first successful, mass marketed package automatic electric refrigeration unit", "the first plug-in refrigeration unit", "the first mass-produced small refrigeration system", "the first electric household refrigerator to survive its infancy" or just as "the domestic electric refrigerator".

According to ASHRAE, DOMELRE contained a number of innovations not found in prior domestic refrigerators, such as offering automatic temperature control by thermostat, an air cooled condenser that did not require water, and not the least, it also introduced a freezing tray for ice cubes.

A 2005 assessment of the history of the ice delivery business in the New York Times concluded that the technology that DOMELRE pioneered gradually led to the end of that business in New York by 1950.
