= W. L. Maxson =

American investor and businessman

William Leslie Maxson
- Born: May 10, 1898; Necedah, Juneau County, Wisconsin, United States
- Died: July 15, 1947 (aged 49); Boston, Suffolk County, Massachusetts, United States
- Burial place: East Hanover Township, Morris County, New Jersey, United States
- Occupations: Inventor, businessman
- Known for: Inventing the Strato-Meals, M45 Quadmount, Fairchild-Maxson Mark I

William Leslie Maxson (May 10, 1898 – July 15, 1947) was an American inventor and businessman best known for his contributions to military technology and the development of pre-prepared frozen meals.

== Early life and career ==
William Leslie Maxson was born on May 10, 1898, in Necedah, Juneau county, Wisconsin, to Charles Henry Maxson and Hilda Marie Hanson. Maxson's early life saw him pursue a career in the military, culminating in his graduation from the United States Naval Academy in 1921. In 1922, Maxson married Mary Irene Steely in Pocatello, Idaho, and they went on to have three children: Mary Jane, William Leslie Jr., and Sally.

He served in the Navy for 15 years, until his resignation in 1935. During his naval service, Maxson began to develop an interest in food preservation, which would later prove crucial to his wartime innovations.

Upon leaving the Navy, Maxson established the W. L. Maxson Corporation. One of the company's initial products was a computing gasoline pump, demonstrating his early aptitude for mechanical innovation.

Prior to his wartime food innovations, he lived in Garden City, Hempstead, Nassau, New York, in 1935 and then in West Orange, Essex, New Jersey, by 1940. This period laid the groundwork for his later contributions to both military technology and food preservation, most notably the development of pre-cooked, quick-frozen meals for naval air transport during World War II.

== W. L. Maxson Corporation ==
Maxson founded the W. L. Maxson Corporation, which became a significant contributor to the American war effort during World War II. The company specialized in manufacturing military equipment and also explored innovations in food technology. The W.L. Maxson Corporation received loans and continued after his death.

== Inventions ==
Maxson's inventive work spanned multiple areas, including food technology and military weaponry.

Patent number	Title	Inventor name	Publication date	Number of Pages
US-2042615-A	Indicator	MAXSON WILLIAM L	June 02, 1936	5
US-2145843-A	Computing mechanism	MAXSON WILLIAM L	January 31, 1939	9
US-2236375-A	Navigator's reference machine	MAXSON WILLIAM L	March 25, 1941	11
US-2202592-A	Building block	MAXSON WILLIAM L	May 28, 1940	6
US-2490076-A	Electric oven	MAXSON WILLIAM L	June 12, 1949	5
US-2425816-A	Apparatus for cooling under ultraviolet radiation and vacuum conditions	MAXSON WILLIAM L	August 19, 1949	7
US-2194477-A	Multiplying machine	MAXSON WILLIAM L et al.	March 26, 1940	18
US-2295998-A	Variable ratio gearing	MAXSON WILLIAM L et al.	September 15, 1942	21
US-2397476-A	Method and apparatus for controlling moving vehicles	MAXSON WILLIAM L et al.	April 2, 1946	24

Key inventions include:

- Strato-Meals (Frozen Sky Plates):

In 1944, Maxson pioneered the development of pre-prepared frozen meals, marketed as "Strato-Meals" or "Sky Plates." These meals were designed for military and airline use, providing nutritious and convenient food options.

- M33 Machine Gun Mount:

The W. L. Maxson Corporation developed the M33 machine gun mount, a twin .50 caliber M2 Browning machine gun mount used during World War II.

- M45 Quad Mount:

The M45 quad mount, an anti-aircraft weapon consisting of four .50 caliber M2 Browning machine guns, was developed by the W. L. Maxson Corporation as an improvement over the M33. It was used extensively during World War II.

- Fairchild-Maxson Mark I Line of Position Computer:

Introduced in 1938, the Fairchild-Maxson Mark I Line of Position Computer was a mechanical aerial navigation instrument designed to simplify celestial navigation calculations. It was used by the USAAF.

- Maxson's Whirlwind Oven:

Maxson also developed an early hot air oven, known as the Whirlwind oven, a precursor to the modern air fryer. It used a 24-volt D.C. motor, standard in aircraft of the time to circulate hot air. The unit could heat six plates, although Maxson had created a device that could heat 120 at a time for a cargo ship for the War Shipping Administration.

== Death and burial ==
Maxson died on July 15, 1947, in Boston, Massachusetts, at the age of 49. He was buried in East Hanover Township, New Jersey.
