= Auto-defrost =

Frost suppression in refrigerators or freezers

Auto-defrost, automatic defrost or self-defrosting is a technique which regularly defrosts the evaporator in a refrigerator or freezer. Appliances using this technique are often called frost free, frostless, or no-frost.

== Mechanism ==
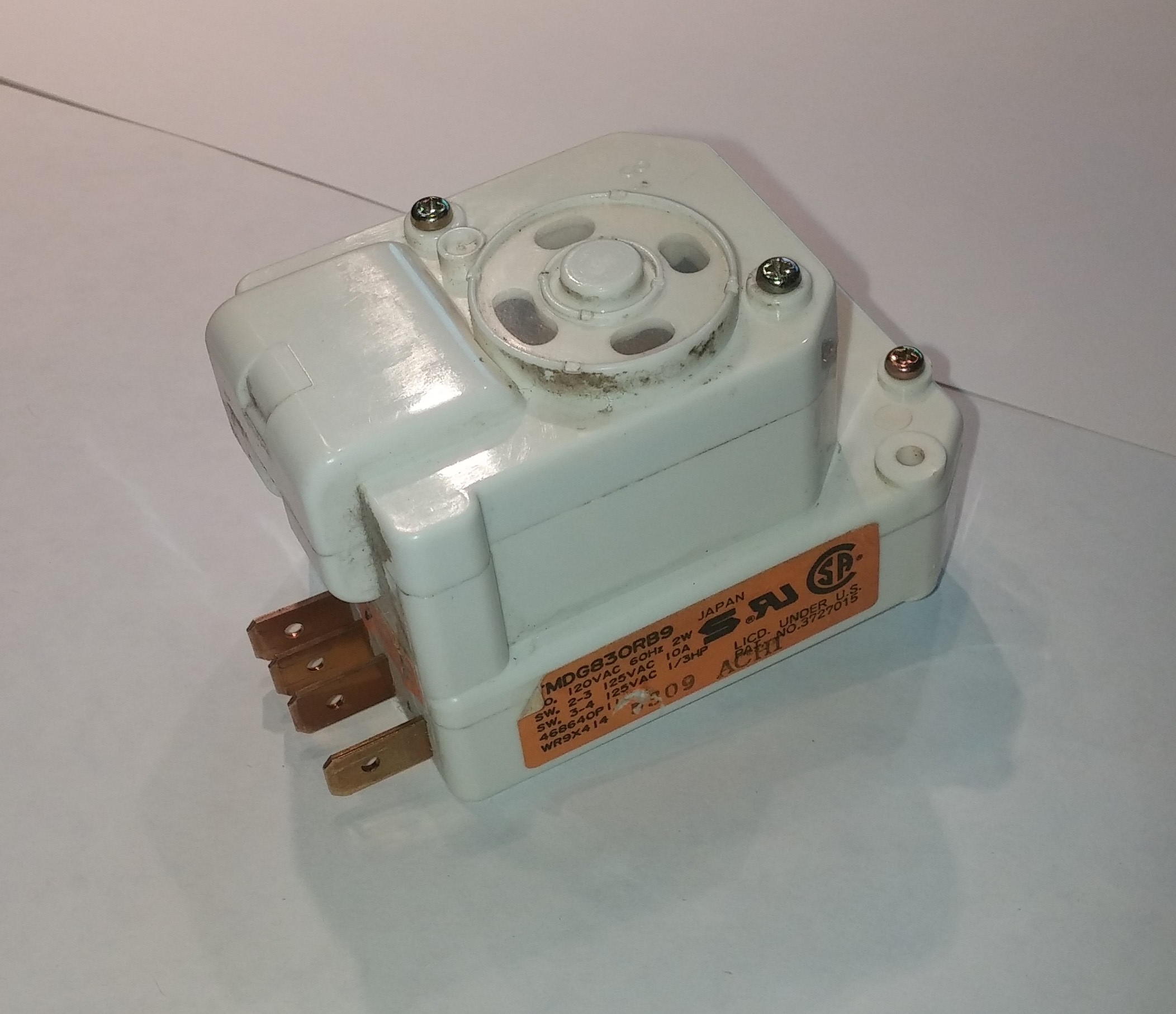
A defrost timer taken out of a household refrigerator

The defrost mechanism in a refrigerator heats the cooling element (evaporator coil) for a short period of time and melts the frost that has formed on it. The resulting water drains through a duct at the back of the unit. Defrosting is controlled by an electric or electronic timer. For every 6, 8, 10, 12 or 24 hours of compressor operation, it turns on a defrost heater for 15 minutes to half an hour.

The defrost heater, having a typical power rating of 350W to 600W, is often mounted just below the evaporator in top and bottom-freezer models. It can also be located below and in the middle of the evaporator in side-by-side models. It may be protected from short circuits by means of fusible links. In older refrigerators, the timer runs continuously. In newer designs, the timer only runs while the compressor runs, so the longer the refrigerator door is closed, the less time the heater will run for and the more energy is saved.

A defrost thermostat opens the heater circuit when the evaporator temperature rises above a preset temperature, 40°F (5°C) or more, thereby preventing excessive heating of the freezer compartment. The defrost timer is such that either the compressor or the defrost heater is on, but not both at the same time.

Inside the freezer, air is circulated by means of one or more fans. In a typical design cold air from the freezer compartment is ducted to the fresh food compartment and circulated back into the freezer compartment. Air circulation helps sublimate any ice or frost that may form on frozen items in the freezer compartment. While defrosting, this fan is stopped to prevent heated-up air from reaching the food compartment.

Instead of the normal cooling elements being embedded in the freezer liner, auto-defrost elements are behind or beneath the liner. This allows them to be heated for short periods of time to dispose of frost, without heating the contents of the freezer.

Alternatively, some systems use the hot gas in the condenser to defrost the evaporator. This is done by means of a circuit that is cross-linked by a three-way valve. The hot gas quickly heats up the evaporator and defrosts it. This system is primarily used in commercial applications such as ice-cream displays.

== Application ==
While this technique was originally applied to the refrigerator compartment, it was later used for freezer compartment as well.

A combined refrigerator/freezer which applies self-defrosting to the refrigerator compartment only is usually called "partial frost free" or semi-automatic defrost (some brands call these "Auto Defrost" while Frigidaire referred to their semi-automatic models as "Cycla-Matic," Kelvinator often named these models as "Cyclic Defrost" ). These refrigerators usually have a pan underneath where water from the melted frost in the refrigerator section evaporates.

Freezers with automatic defrosting and combined refrigerator/freezer units which also apply self defrosting to their freezer compartment are called "frost free". The latter usually feature an air connection between the two compartments with the air passage to the refrigerator compartment regulated by a damper. By this means, a controlled portion of the air coming from the freezer reaches the refrigerator. Some older models have no air circulation between their freezer and refrigerator sections. Instead, they use an independent cooling system (for example: an evaporator coil with a defrost heater and a circulating fan in the freezer and a cold-plate or open-coil evaporator in the refrigerator.

"Frost-Free" refrigerator/freezer units usually use a heating element to defrost their evaporators, a pan to collect and evaporate water from the frost that melts from the cold plate and/or evaporator coil, a timer which turns off the compressor and turns on the defrost element usually from once to 4 times a day for periods usually ranging from 15 to 30 minutes, a defrost limiter thermostat that turns off the heating element before the temperature rises too much while the timer is still in its defrost phase. Some models also feature a drain heater to prevent ice from blocking the drain.

Other early types of refrigerators also use hot gas defrost instead of electric heaters. These reverse the evaporator and condenser sides for the defrost cycle.

Some newer refrigerator/freezer models have a computer that monitors how many times each door is opened and uses this data to control defrost scheduling thereby reducing power use.

== Advantages ==
- No need to manually defrost the frost buildup, therefore power consumption will not increase with time.
- Food packaging is easier to see.
- Most frozen food will not stick together.
- Smells are limited, especially in total frost-free appliances because the air always circulates.
- Better temperature management.

== Disadvantages ==
- The system can be more expensive to run when usage is high and if the fan continues or starts to run when the door is opened.
- A thermal cutout safety device is required to prevent overheating of the heating element.
- Increased electrical and mechanical complexity compared to a basic upright freezer or chest freezer, making it more prone to component failure.
- The temperature of the freezer contents rises during the defrosting cycles, especially if there is a light load in the freezer. This can cause "freezer burn" on the freezer contents from partially defrosting and then re-freezing
- On hot, humid days condensation will sometimes form around the refrigerator doors.
- Defrosting may not be completed by the time the defrost timer cycles back to normal operation (especially in hot, humid conditions with frequent door openings), leaving ice/frost on the evaporator coils. This condition can lead to "icing" which will interfere with the operation of the refrigerator.

In laboratories, self-defrosting freezers must not be used to store certain delicate reagents such as enzymes, because the temperature cycling can degrade them. In addition, water can evaporate out of containers that do not have a very tight seal, altering the concentration of the reagents. Self-defrosting freezers should never be used to store flammable chemicals.
