= Amisan =

Amisan may refer to:

- Amisan (Gangwon), mountain in South Korea
- Amisan (South Chungcheong), mountain in South Korea
