= European Movement for Efficient Energy =

- Founded: 2011
- Purpose: Energy Efficiency
- Location: Brussels, Belgium
- Region served: Europe
- Website: http://eme2.eu/default.aspx

The European Movement for Efficient Energy (EME²) is a stakeholder platform that seek to promote efficiency in the energy sector as a means to achieve overall energy and resource efficiency in Europe. This would mean producing and delivering more energy for final consumption from less primary energy and other natural resources, notably water and land. This is EME² refers to as "efficient energy”. The current primary focus or their campaign is on the supply of more resource-efficient electricity and combined heat and power.

== Background ==
The global energy system has enormous potential to make energy savings. GE Energy estimates that from a total primary energy input for electricity production of 49,555 TWh, only 15,623 TWh of electricity was delivered to customers worldwide. At the European Union level, the energy sector consumes 30% of primary energy consumption and an analysis by Delta Energy and Environment of the France, Poland and the UK shows that increases supply-side efficiency has the same overall energy saving potential as demand-side efficiency. In France, Poland and the UK, Delta estimates that supply-side options can contribute up to 32% of the overall goal of a 20% carbon emission reduction and up to 26% of an overall goal to reduce primary energy consumption by 20%.

EME² argues that ensuring supply-side energy efficiency requires system-wide cohesion and investment, from the supply and conversion of primary energy through to the transmission and distribution of power and heat. The movement places no emphasis on a specific energy source and argues that Europe will continue to rely on a broad mix of energy sources and innovative technologies over the coming decades. Such a mix would evolve and vary from region to region and country to country for both political and practical reasons. EME² define's its purpose as to "help drive understanding and uptake of policy strategies and technologies for maximising supply-side, system-wide efficiencies whatever the mix".

The concept of efficient energy includes more than reducing greenhouse gases; it also includes the efficient use of resources, fuel, water and land. It is about developing a more resource efficient energy production and delivery system in Europe.

== EU policy today ==
EU policy-makers have given significant attention has been given to energy efficiency amongst energy consumers. Policies addressing to this 'end-use' energy efficiency including encouraging the renovation and increased insulation of buildings, promoting energy labels for electrical appliances and phasing out high-energy light bulbs. EME² argues more attention should now be paid to supply-side energy efficiency.

The European Commission has begun to address these issues. In its Energy Efficiency Plan (March 2011), the European Commission called on EU member states to expand the scope of their energy efficiency policies beyond the demand side to the supply side, i.e. energy production and delivery. Specifically the plan calls for the increaseduse of energy production from co-generation and combined heat and power systems to help Europe achieve its energy goals. The Commission is further looking to strengthen the basis for national grid regulators consider energy efficiency issues in their decisions and in monitoring the management and operation of gas and electricity grids and markets.

In September 2011, the European Commission also released a Roadmap for a Resource Efficient Europe. That roadmap described the economic benefits of using resources more efficiently, by creating major economic opportunities for companies and workers, improving productivity, reducing costs and enhancing competitiveness. A key and potentially most controversial plank of the Commission proposal is to shift taxation from labour to resource use. It seeks to address market prices that do not reflect the true costs of using resources and their environmental impacts, by removing Environmentally Harmful Subsidies (EHS). The roadmap also suggests turning waste into a key resource with the aim of decreasing the EU's dependency on imports of raw materials, lower impacts on the environment and open up new markets. The roadmap sets a 2020 target for all key resources – ecosystem services, biodiversity, minerals and metals, water, air, land and soil and marine resources – and lists a series of actions and initiatives the EU and its member states should embark on.

== Membership and Funding ==
EME² is funded by participants contributions with initial funding from GE Energy. EME² has appointed Burson-Marsteller Brussels to act as the secretariat of the movement. Its members include:

- Alstom
- Bayer
- EWE
- COGEN Europe
- demosEUROPA
- Fortum
- GE Energy
- SAP
- Scottish European Green Energy Centre
- SSE
- World Wide Fund for Nature
