= CHP Directive =

EU Directive on cogeneration of heat and power

The Directive on the promotion of cogeneration based on a useful heat demand in the internal energy market and amending Directive 92/42/EEC, officially Directive 2004/8/EC, is a European Union directive for promoting the use of cogeneration, popularly better known as the 'Combined Heat and Power (CHP) Directive'.

Its aim is to increase the energy efficiency and improve the security of supply of energy, to be achieved by creating a framework for the promotion and development of high efficiency cogeneration.

The directive entered into force in February 2004 and member states have been obliged to begin its implementation since 2006. However, due to delays resulting out of the comitology process, member states were given until 6 August 2007 to adopt the first obligations of the directive. The directive amended a former directive, Directive 92/62/EEC.

It is intended that the directive will have a significant impact on the legislation and the diffusion of CHP/cogeneration and district heating within the member states of the European Union.

In summary, the Member States are obliged to produce reports covering their analysis of the state of CHP in their own countries, to promote CHP and show what is being done to promote it, to report on and remove barriers, and to track progress of high-efficiency cogeneration within the energy market.

== Directorate-General for Energy ==
The directive comes under and is administered by the European Commission’s Directorate-General for Energy.

== Support mechanism for CHP per member states ==
EU27 – Member States' national support schemes available by categories:

EU27-Member States	Feed-In Tariffs (FIT)	Feed-in Premiums (FIP)	Certificates	Tax Support	Capital Grant	Other
Austria	x					x
Wallonia			G			x
Flanders			G, W			x
Brussels			G			x
Bulgaria	x (only for RES) Upcoming					x
Cyprus						x
Czech Republic		x				x
Denmark						x
Estonia						x
Finland	x (only for RES) Upcoming				x	x
France	x					x
Germany		x				x
Greece	x					x
Hungary	x					x
Ireland^{1}						x
Italy			x		x	x
Latvia	x					x
Lithuania	x					x
Luxembourg						x
Malta^{2}						x
Netherlands	x (only for RES) Upcoming				x	x
Poland^{3}						x
Portugal	x				x	x
Romania						
Slovak Republic	x					
Slovenia	x				x	x
Spain						x
Sweden					x	x
United Kingdom^{4}	x (only for RES)			x		

RES = Renewable energy sources
NG = Natural gas
Certificates: W = White certificates, R = Red certificates, Y = Yellow certificates, G = Green certificates
Notes:

1. Grant support system to assist the deployment of small scale (less than 1 MWe) fossil-fired CHP and biomass (anaerobic digestion and wood residue) CHP systems + Financial tax incentives (Accelerated Capital Allowance Scheme)
2. Support schemes are under consideration in Malta
3. In Poland Red certificates are the equivalent of White certificates (for CHP) in other countries. Polish Authorities also created Yellow certificates (for Natural gas and CHP small systems below 1 MW of electric output) which compensate for relatively high cost of natural gas or high investment cost of distributed systems.
4. Under the UK's Renewables Obligation, CHP plants using renewable energy fuel, such as biomass and biogas, benefit from a premium on each MWh of electricity produced. New feed-in tariffs for renewables were expected to enter into force from April 2010. The UK is no longer a member of the European Union.

== See also ==
- Energy policy of the European Union
- Cogeneration
- District heating
- Energy law
- Relative cost of electricity generated by different sources
- COGEN Europe
- Gas engine
- New York City steam system
- Organic Rankine cycle
- Pinch analysis
- Stirling engine
