= Fuel Cells and Hydrogen =

Fuel cells and hydrogen may refer to:

- a hydrogen cell, a kind of fuel cell
- the European Fuel Cells and Hydrogen Joint Technology Initiative
