= Tropical EC-60043 =

Greek electric city car

Tropical EC-60043 electric car

Tropical EC-60043 was an electric-powered 4-seat city car produced by Tropical, a Greek company specializing in the development of electric and hydrogen-powered vehicles and machinery.

The EC-60043, essentially an assembled version of a U.S. model, had a 5.2 hp (4 kW @ 48V) electric engine, a maximum speed of 45 km/h (28 mph) and a maximum range of 90 km (56 mi). As of 2018, the vehicles are no longer being sold.
