= Port of Pyeongtaek-Dangjin =

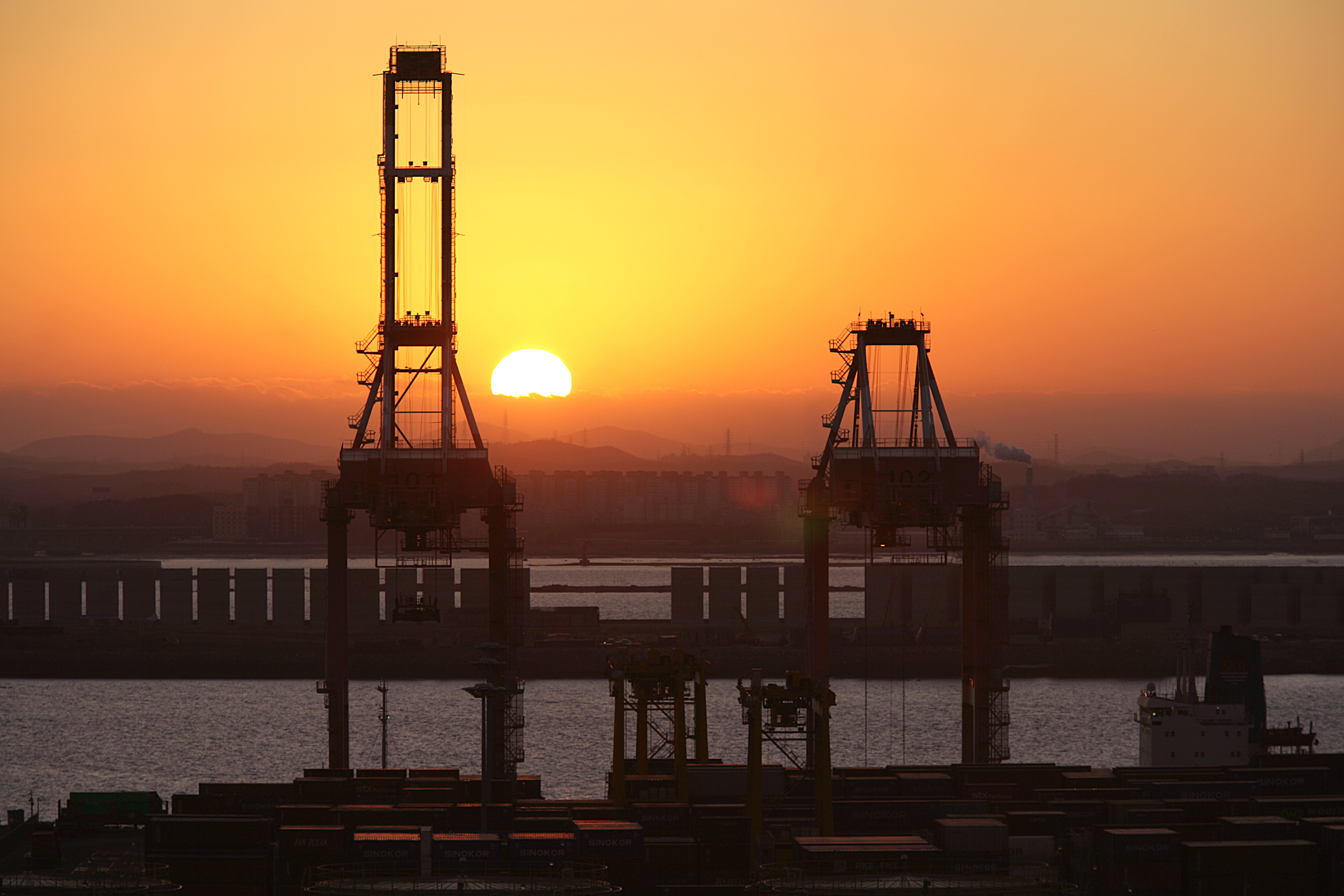
- Click on the map for a fullscreen view

Location
- Country: South Korea
- Location: Pyeongtaek and Dangjin
- Coordinates: 36°58′N 126°48′E
- UN/LOCODE: KRPTK; KRTJI

The Port of Pyeongtaek-Dangjin is a port in South Korea, located in the cities of Pyeongtaek and Dangjin.
