= Amisan (South Chungcheong) =

Mountain in South Korea

Highest point
- Elevation: 349 m (1,145 ft)

Geography
- Location: Dangjin, South Korea

Amisan (Korean: 아미산) is a mountain of Dangjin, South Korea. It has an elevation of 349 metres (1,145 ft).

== Geology ==
Amisan lends its name to the Amisan formation, which is an important geological region. This region is approximately 1,000 meters thick and is composed of alternating layers of sandstone and shale. This formation dates back to the Upper Triassic era, and contains various influential fossil specimens. In 2022, a fossil of an insect wing was uncovered in this region and was determined to be Shurabia taewani sp. nov. This is the first ever discovered remains of the now extinct Geinitziidae family in South Korea. While the Geinitziidae family has been recorded in other parts of the world, this is the very first instance of it being discovered in South Korea. This discovery has led scientists to believe that the insect paleofauna of the Amisan Formation has much more to be discovered and may require deeper study.

== Paleontology ==
The Amisan Formation is a rock formation dating back to the late Triassic period that contains a greater number of fossils than many of the surrounding areas. This distinction has led to the Amisan Formation becoming an influential area for study for paleontologists. A notable fossils discovered in this area are insects, ray-finned fishes, and early vertebrates. These fossil discoveries have made a large impact on the current understanding of the ecosystems from the Triassic period in East Asia. Many discoveries have been made in regard to the history of the Korean peninsula.

One of the more notable discoveries from the Amisan Formation are the fossils of ray finned fish which played a large role in the Triassic period ecosystem. In 2024 a group of especially well preserved ray finned fish were discovered. These fossils were clear enough to discern fine details in areas such as the fins and skulls of the fish. These details allowed scientists to better understand the growth cycle of the fish and what role they played in the prehistoric ecosystem. The fact that such well preserved fossils were created also gives major indicators about the previous climate and environment of this area during the Triassic period.

In addition to the discovery discussed above, a 2020 study resulted in the discovery of a new species called Hiascoactinus boryeongensis. This fish belongs to the redfieldiiforms which are also an extinct group of ray finned fish. This discovery was impactful to scientists because up to this point, Hiascoactinus boryeongensis were only observed to of lived in other parts of the world. This discovery suggests that these fishes spread further than previously thought across Pangea. It also suggests that the Amisan formation contains a much more diverse collection of fossils than previously thought.

== See also ==
- List of mountains of Korea
