= Dangjin =

City in South Chungcheong, South Korea

Coordinates: 36°53′35″N 126°37′41″E

- Municipal City
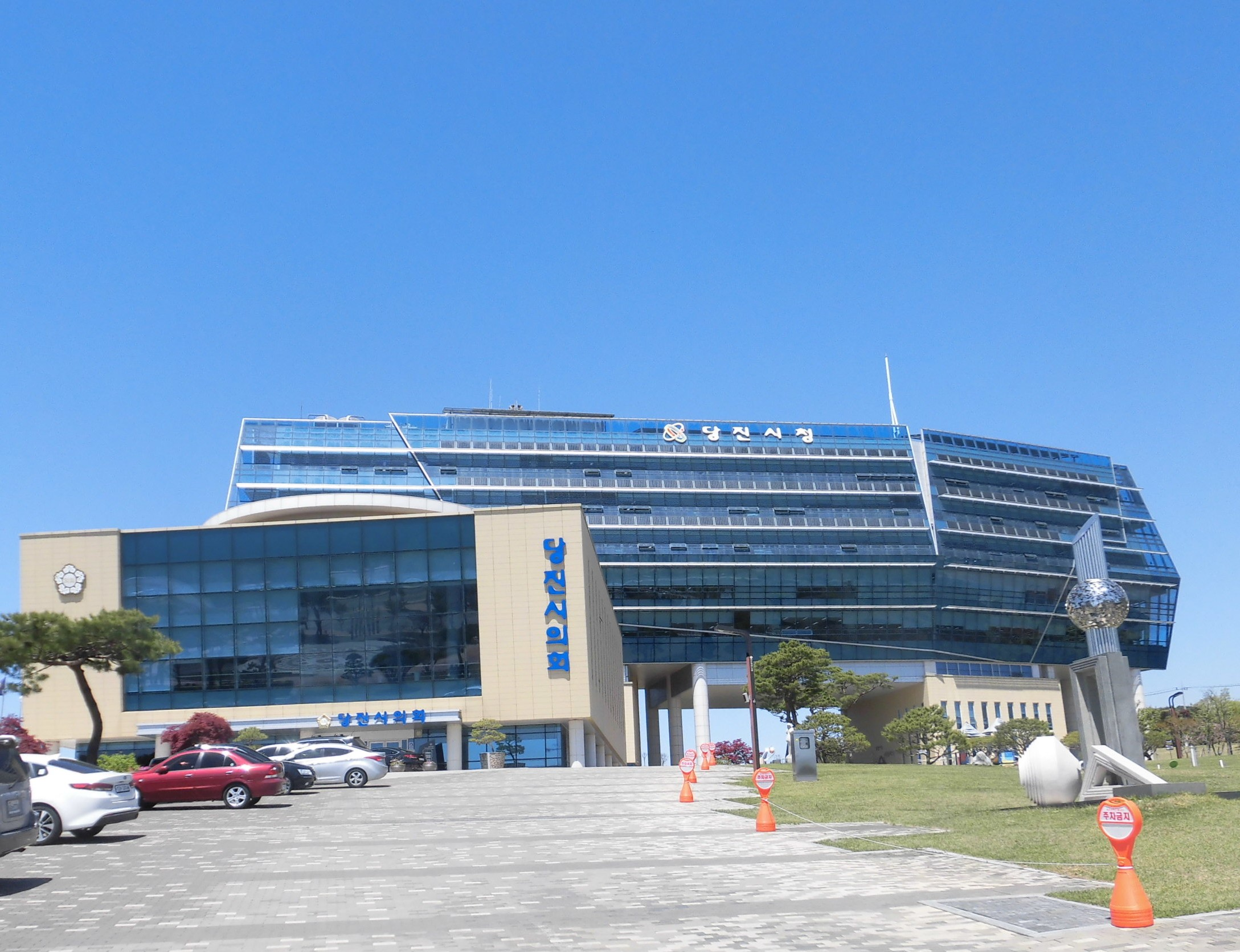
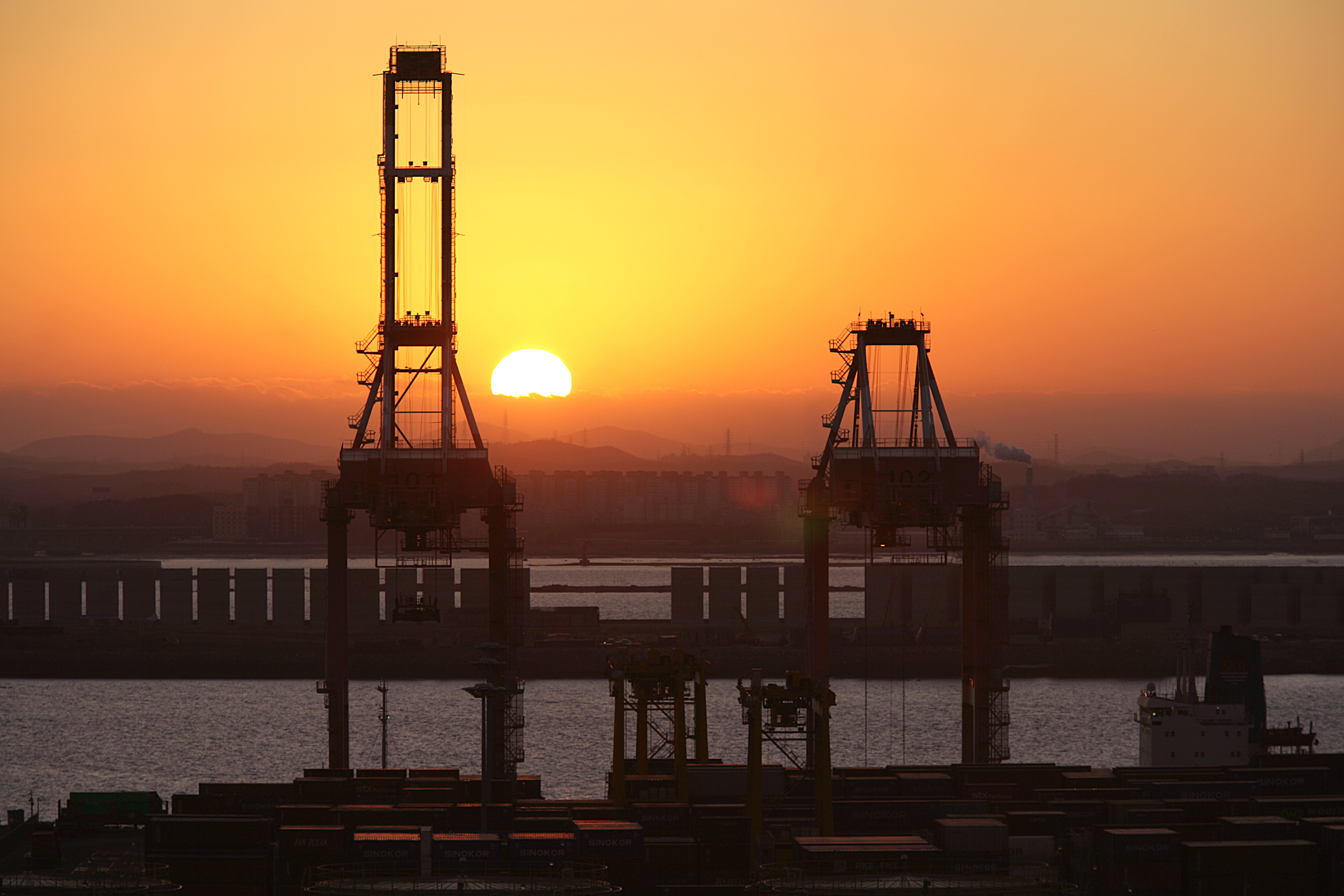
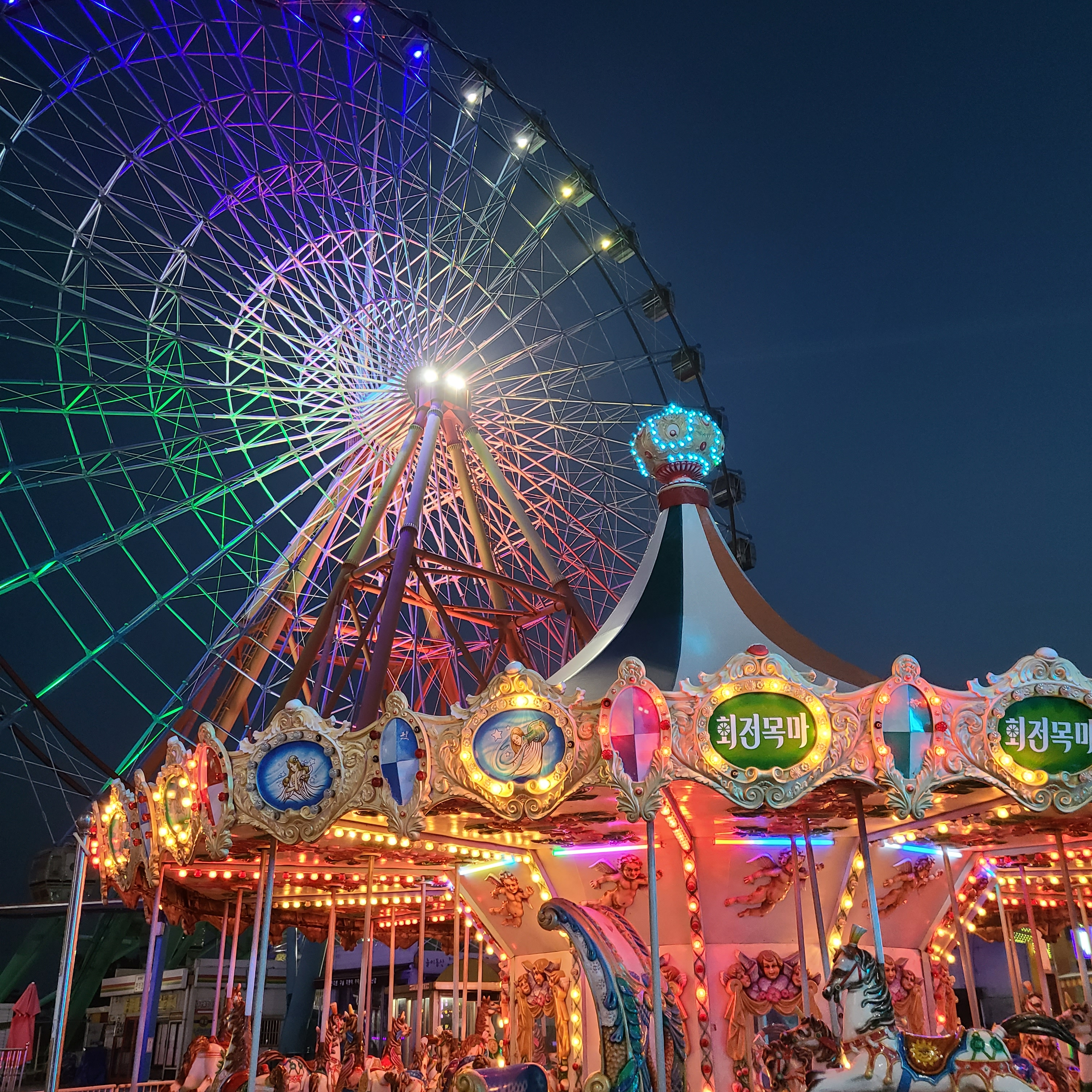
- From the left: Dangjin City Hall, Port of Pyeongtaek-Dangjin, and Sapgyoho Amsusement Park

- Flag Emblem of Dangjin

- Location in South Korea
- Country: South Korea
- Region: Hoseo
- Administrative divisions: 2 eup, 9 myeon, 3 dong

Area
  - Total: 664.13 km^{2} (256.42 sq mi)

Population (September 2024)
  - Total: 171,213
  - Density: 176.8/km^{2} (458/sq mi)
  - Dialect: Chungcheong

Korean name
- Hangul: 당진시
- Hanja: 唐津市
- RR: Dangjin-si
- MR: Tangjin-si

Dangjin (Korean: 당진; Korean pronunciation: [taŋ.dʑin]) is a city in South Chungcheong Province, South Korea. It stands on the south shore of the Bay of Asan. Dangjin borders Incheon, Pyeongtaek, and Hwaseong by sea, and Seosan, Yesan, and Asan by land. Its name means "Tang ferry," and refers to the historic role of Dangjin's harbor in connecting Korea to the other side of the Yellow Sea. This role continues to be important in the city's economy, which relies on a mixture of agriculture and heavy industry. The city has the same Hanja name (唐津市) as Karatsu in Saga Prefecture, Japan.

== Administrative divisions ==
The city is divided into 2 eup, 9 myeon and 3 dong.

== History ==
The name "Dangjin" was first used to refer to this area during the Joseon period. From 1413 to 1895, it was known as Dangjin-hyeon, a division of Chungcheong Province. The city achieved its present borders in 1973, with the merger of a portion of Jeongmi-myeon into Seosan's Unsan-myeon. It was originally a county but was promoted to a city on January 1, 2012, after a rapid population boost.

Being on the Yellow Sea, the port has been important for trade with China, and since early times was defended against foreign invasion by becoming a fortress city (Eupseong). According to legend, the eupseong was built in the 16th year of King Chungyeol (1290 AD), but it is currently believed to have been built during the Baekje period and modified throughout the Joseon period to prevent foreign invasion. Mianchuan Eupseong is a city with four gates in the east, west, south, and north. It was rebuilt in the 13th year of King Taejong of the Joseon Dynasty, and it was rebuilt during the reign of King Gyeongjong.

== Education ==
As of March 2005, in Dangjin there were 33 elementary schools, 12 middle schools, and 38 preschools, serving 14,293 students. In addition, there were 8 high schools. All of these organs are overseen by the Dangjin Office of Education.

There are some institution of higher education in the city is Shinsung College (신성대학교), Hoseo University (호서대학교).

== Economy ==
Dangjin is home to a number of factories, including steel mills operated by Hyundai Hysco and Hyundai INI Steel. These factories are supplied in part by ships docking at Dangjin Harbor, a cargo port with 5 piers, two of which are dedicated to steel coil shipping.

== Notable people ==
=== Entertainment ===
- Geum Bo-ra, actress
- Taehwan (Vanner), singer

=== Society ===
- Saint Andrew Kim Taegon, Catholic priest and patron saint of Korean clergy
- Chong Moon Lee, entrepreneur and philanthropist
- Song Young-jin, politician

=== Sports ===
- Choi Yong-soo, boxer
- Gim Eun-ji, curler
- Han Myung-woo, wrestler and Olympic gold medalist
- Kim Gi-dong, footballer and coach
- Kim Gi-jung, badminton player
- Lee Jong-sung, footballer
- Park Sung-woo, badminton player and coach
- Seo Myeong-won, footballer
- Sin Hyeon-ju, sports shooter
- Yoo Yong-sung, badminton player and two-time Olympic medalist

== Sister cities ==
=== Overseas Sister Cities ===
- Snohomish County, Washington, United States
- Rizhao, Shandong, China
- Daisen, Akita, Japan
