= Tropical (vehicles) =

Greek vehicle manufacturer

Tropical Hydrogen-powered Hydrogen Fuel Cell Truck. It is based on the earlier Tropical TR-71011 electric light truck, and is also available with "conventional" electric engine.

Tropical EC-60043, electric-powered car.

Tropical (successor to Alfa) is a Greek manufacturer involved in machinery and vehicle development and production.

== History ==
Alfa was founded in 1976, originally producing vehicle bodies, but it soon ventured into vehicle design and development (it customers included ELBO, for which it developed both bus models and production technology). In 1986 it announced its plans to produce a 4-seat city car it had designed; however, the difficulties for obtaining production permit and, possibly, the poor prospects of the car in the Greek market, cancelled its further development. Instead, Alfa focused on the production of a variety of bus types, as well as air-conditioning and refrigeration units for commercial vehicles.

The company went out of business due to the crisis in the bus market in Greece (after imports of used buses were allowed), but it was re-founded as Tropical in 1991. Its main activity switched to design and production of air-conditioning and refrigeration units for commercial vehicles and trains (with significant exports), as well as body and specialized vehicle manufacture. A new chapter in its history opened in 1995, though, when it entered the field of power based on renewable energy sources.

== Hydrogen-powered engines and vehicles ==
Since the late 1990s, Tropical has invested heavily in research and development of a wide variety of hydrogen-powered generators, appliances and vehicles. A number of hydrogen-powered vehicles have been introduced since 2005, including 2- and 4-seat city cars, light trucks, buses, scooters, forklifts and ATV’s (the vehicles are only assembled by the company and are also available with "conventional" electric engines). Two hydrogen-powered city cars have even been exported, to Portugal and South Korea. In November 2007 it introduced the first hydrogen refueling plant powered by wind generators (developed in collaboration with Greek research institutes), while in January 2008 it was one of three Greek companies to receive an award for innovation by Bill Gates. A new city car was introduced in 2008 (strongly resembling the Smart Fortwo), while latest research projects include the "zero-accident electric car" designed with the aim to provide complete safety to its passengers.

== Micro combined heat and power ==
In 2013 Tropical entered the European micro combined heat and power market with its 5kW system.
