= Power loss factor =

The power loss factor β describes the loss of electrical power in CHP systems with a variable power-to-heat ratio when an increasing heat flow is extracted from the main thermodynamic electricity generating process in order to provide useful heat. Usually, the power loss factor refers to extraction steam turbines in thermal power stations, which conduct a part of the steam in a heating condenser for the production of useful heat, instead of the low pressure part of the steam turbine where it could perform mechanical work.

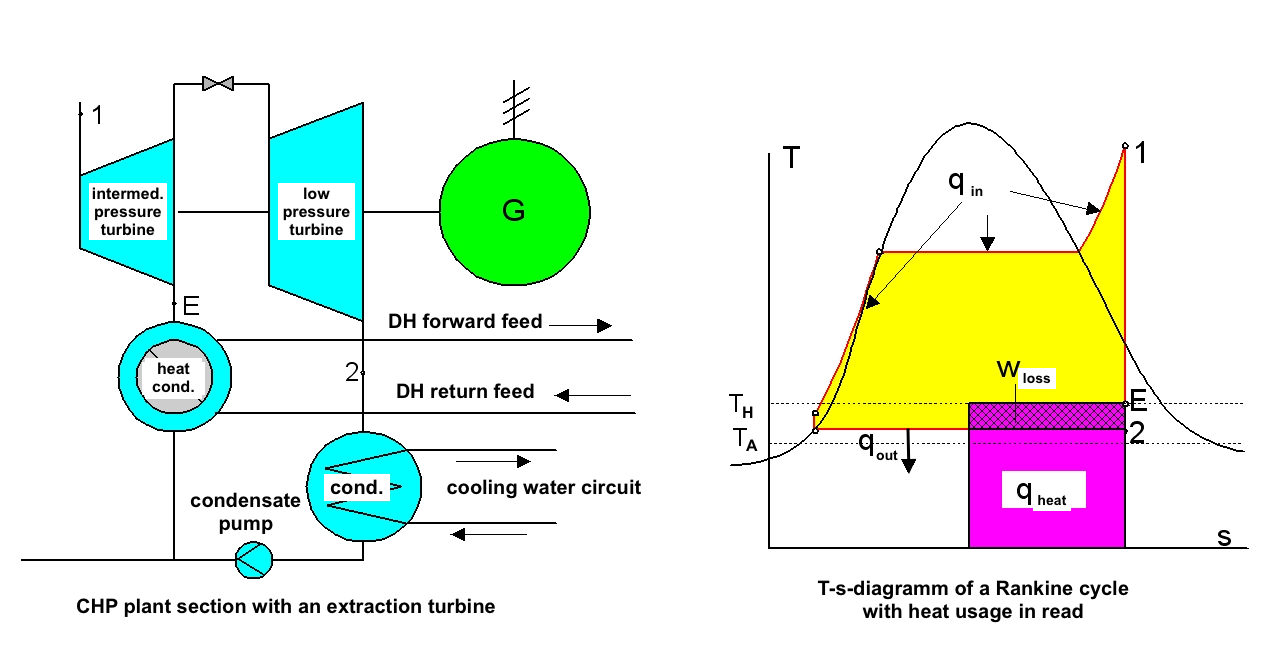
Power loss within an extraction steam turbine: CHP plant section (left) and T-s-diagram (right)

$\beta = \frac{\Delta P_\text{el}}{\dot Q_\text{utile}}$

The picture on the right shows in the left part the principle of steam extraction. After the intermediate-pressure section of the turbine, i.e. before the low-pressure section, steam is diverted and flows into the heating condenser, where it transfers heat to the heating circuit (temperature level T_{H} about 100 °C) and liquefies. The remaining steam works in the low-pressure section of the turbine and is then liquefied in the condenser at approx. 30 °C. Then it is fed via the condensate pump to the feedwater circuit. The partial steam flow, which goes into the heating condenser at high temperature can no longer work in the low-pressure section and is responsible for the loss of power.

The right-hand side of the picture shows the associated T-s diagram (see Rankine cycle) for an operating state in which half of the waste heat is used for heating purposes. To the left of the red square, the white area below the red line corresponds to the waste heat (q_{out}), which is released via the condenser to the environment (ambient temperature level T_{A}). The entire red area corresponds to the useful heat (q_{heat}), the upper hatched part of this area corresponds to the power loss in the low pressure stage.

Modern cogeneration plants have power loss ratios of about 1/5 to 1/9 when delivering heat in the range of 80 °C-120 °C. That means in exchange of one kWh of electrical energy ca. 5 up to 9 kWh of useful heat are obtained.

Based on the equivalence of power loss and gain of heat, the power loss method assigns CO_{2} emissions and primary energy from the fuel to the useful heat and the electrical energy.
