= Carnot method =

Energy allocation method

The Carnot method (English: /kɑːrˈnoʊ/ kar-NOH, French: [kaʁno]) is an allocation procedure for dividing up fuel input (primary energy, end energy) in joint production processes that generate two or more energy products in one process (e.g. cogeneration or trigeneration). It is also suited to allocate other streams, such as CO_{2}-emissions or variable costs. The potential to provide physical work (exergy) is the distribution key. For heat, this potential can be assessed by the Carnot efficiency. Thus, the Carnot method is a form of an exergetic allocation method. It uses mean heat grid temperatures at the output of the process as a calculation basis. The Carnot method's advantage is that no external reference values are required to allocate the input to the different output streams; only endogenous process parameters are needed. Thus, the allocation results remain unbiased of assumptions or external reference values and open for discussion.

== Fuel allocation factor ==
The fuel share a_{el} which is needed to generate the combined product electrical energy W (work) and a_{th} thermal energy H (useful heat) respectively, can be calculated accordingly to the first and second laws of thermodynamics as follows:

a_{el}= (1 · η_{el}) / (1 · η_{el} + η_{c} · η_{th})

a_{th}= (η_{c} · η_{th}) / (1 · η_{el} + η_{c} · η_{th})

Note: a_{el} + a_{th} = 1

with
a_{el}: allocation factor for electrical energy, i.e. the share of the fuel input which is allocated to electricity production
a_{th}: allocation factor for thermal energy, i.e. the share of the fuel input which is allocated to heat production

η_{el} = W/Q_{F}
η_{th} = H/Q_{F}
W: electrical work
H: useful heat
Q_{F}: Total heat, fuel or primary energy input

and
η_{c}: Carnot factor 1-T_{i}/T_{s} (Carnot factor for electrical energy is 1)
T_{i}: lower temperature, inferior (ambient)
T_{s}: upper temperature, superior (useful heat)

A good approximation for the upper temperature in a heating system is the average between the forward and return flow on the distribution side of the heat exchanger.
T_{s} = (T_{FF}+T_{RF}) / 2
or - if more thermodynamic precision is needed - the logarithmic mean temperature is used
T_{s} = (T_{FF}-T_{RF}) / ln(T_{FF}/T_{RF})
If process steam is delivered, which condenses and evaporates at the same temperature, T_{s} is the temperature of the saturated steam of a given pressure.

== Fuel factor ==
The fuel intensity or the fuel factor for electrical energy f_{F,el} resp. Thermal energy f_{F,th} is the relation of specific input to output.

f_{F,el}= a_{el} / η_{el} = 1 / (η_{el} + η_{c} · η_{th})

f_{F,th}= a_{th} / η_{th} = η_{c} / (η_{el} + η_{c} · η_{th})

== Primary energy factor ==
To obtain the primary energy factors of cogenerated heat and electricity, the energy prechain needs to be considered.

f_{PE,el} = f_{F,el} · f_{PE,F}
f_{PE,th} = f_{F,th} · f_{PE,F}

with
f_{PE,F}: primary energy factor of the used fuel

== Effective efficiency ==
The reciprocal value of the fuel factor (f-intensity) describes the effective efficiency of the assumed sub-process, which in case of CHP is only responsible for electrical or thermal energy generation. This equivalent efficiency corresponds to the effective efficiency of a "virtual boiler" or a "virtual generator" within the CHP plant.

η_{el, eff} = η_{el} / a_{el} = 1 / f_{F,el}
η_{th, eff} = η_{th} / a_{th} = 1 / f_{F,th}

with
η_{el, eff}: effective efficiency of electricity generation within the CHP process
η_{th, eff}: effective efficiency of heat generation within the CHP process

== Performance factor of energy conversion ==
Next to the efficiency factor which describes the quantity of usable end energies, the quality of energy transformation according to the entropy law is also important. With rising entropy, exergy declines. Exergy does not only consider energy but also energy quality. It can be considered a product of both. Therefore any energy transformation should also be assessed according to its exergetic efficiency or loss ratios. The quality of the product "thermal energy" is fundamentally determined by the mean temperature level at which this heat is delivered. Hence, the exergetic efficiency η_{x} describes how much of the fuel's potential to generate physical work remains in the joint energy products. With cogeneration the result is the following relation:

η_{x,total} = η_{el} + η_{c} · η_{th}

The allocation with the Carnot method always results in:
η_{x,total} = η_{x,el} = η_{x,th}

with
η_{x,total} = exergetic efficiency of the combined process
η_{x,el} = exergetic efficiency of the virtual electricity-only process
η_{x,th} = exergetic efficiency of the virtual heat-only process

The main application area of this method is cogeneration, but it can also be applied to other processes generating a joint products, such as a chiller generating cold and producing waste heat which could be used for low temperature heat demand, or a refinery with different liquid fuels plus heat as an output.

== Mathematical derivation ==
Let's assume a joint production with Input I and a first output O_{1} and a second output O_{2}. f is a factor for rating the relevant product in the domain of primary energy, or fuel costs, or emissions, etc.

evaluation of the input = evaluation of the output

f_{i} · I = f_{1} · O_{1} + f_{2} · O_{2}

The factor for the input f_{i} and the quantities of I, O_{1}, and O_{2} are known. An equation with two unknowns f_{1} and f_{2} has to be solved, which is possible with a lot of adequate tuples. As second equation, the physical transformation of product O_{1} in O_{2} and vice versa is used.

O_{1} = η_{21} · O_{2}

η_{21} is the transformation factor from O_{2} into O_{1}, the inverse 1/η_{21}=η_{12} describes the backward transformation. A reversible transformation is assumed, in order not to favour any of the two directions. Because of the exchangeability of O_{1} and O_{2}, the assessment of the two sides of the equation above with the two factors f_{1} and f_{2} should therefore result in an equivalent outcome. Output O_{2} evaluated with f_{2} shall be the same as the amount of O_{1} generated from O_{2} and evaluated with f_{1}.

f_{1} · (η_{21} · O_{2}) = f_{2} · O_{2}

If we put this into the first equation, we see the following steps:

f_{i} · I = f_{1} · O_{1} + f_{1} · (η_{21} × O_{2})

f_{i} · I = f_{1} · (O_{1} + η_{21} · O_{2})

f_{i} = f_{1} · (O_{1}/I + η_{21} · O_{2}/I)

f_{i} = f_{1} · (η_{1} + η_{21} · η_{2})

f_{1} = f_{i} / (η_{1} + η_{21} · η_{2}) or respectively f_{2} = η_{21} · f_{i} / (η_{1} + η_{21} · η_{2})

with η_{1} = O_{1}/I and η_{2} = O_{2}/I

== See also ==
- Cogeneration
- Variable cost
- Power loss factor
- Joint product pricing
- Nicolas Léonard Sadi Carnot
- Second law of thermodynamics
