= Dantherm =

Dantherm AS
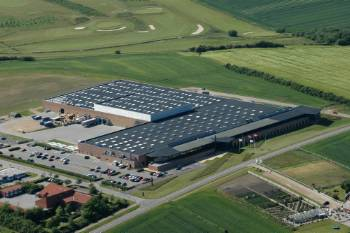
- Company type: Publicly traded (Aktieselskab) Nasdaq Copenhagen: DANTH
- Industry: Air handling
- Founded: 1958, by E.R. Olsen
- Headquarters: Skive, Denmark
- Key people: Torben Duer, Bjarke Brøns
- Products: Electronics cooling, Dehumidifiers, Ventilations, heater units, Residential ventilation, Mobile heating and cooling
- Number of employees: 537(2011)

Dantherm AS is the parent company of several companies involved in the development, production, sale, and installation of industrial air handling products.

== Business model ==
The company works both nationally and internationally, where they have established factories and sales companies. The company's two main areas are Telecommunications and Heating, Ventilation and Air Conditioning (HVAC).

Within their Telecom business unit, the company is a supplier of cooling solutions for the telecom networks suppliers and network operators.

Within their HVAC business unit, there are several branches: defense, dehumidification, swimming pool ventilation, and residential ventilation.

The total sale for the Dantherm group represents 464.6 million Danish krone (DKK). (2010), while the number of employees is approximately 537. The company's profit before tax represented a deficit of 44.5 million DKK, (improving over the previous years, when two entries were negative 96.5 million DKK and 293.1 million DKK). In 2011, they expected an operating profit (EBIT) of 20-25 million DKK, a small profit before tax and a turnover of 500-550 million DKK.

The headquarters of the Dantherm Group is located in Skive.

== History ==
In 1958 E.R. Olsen founded his works under the name Danterm, which was changed to Dantherm. The increase in industrial production was the main force in the 1950s' economic development, which in a few years abolished the high unemployment seen in the Skive region. This meant that many industrial factories were built, and all needed to be heated and therefore could potentially use fan heaters that Eilert meant to develop. In the 1960s the company became a Publicly traded Aktieselskab and sales organizations were created in Norway, Germany, France and England.

In 1973, the company was divided into Dantherm AS as a production company and Dantherm Trading AS, which would handle the negotiation of company products on the Danish market. Eilert was always looking for new opportunities, which resulted in his development, in the late 1970s, of a dehumidifier in cooperation with low power engineer Svend Thøgersen. The dehumidifier was patented and put into production in 1977–88. It was named CD (Condense Dryer). Dehumidifiers are now one of Dantherm's main areas.

In the 1980s—after the 1970s energy crisis—much was done in Denmark to be energy efficient. The company developed a cross flow heat exchanger that could regain the warm air in the building to heat the fresh cool air while ventilating, instead of discharging heat out of the window.

Svend Thøgersen founded in 1983 Stelectric, which started supplying electronics control systems for them. In the mid 1980s Dantherm Norway developed mobile refrigeration and heating equipment for the armed forces and NATO.

In the 1990s they ventured into electronics cooling, with telecommunications network as their main marketing area.

In 1996 the company established a production facility in Spartanburg, United States and in 2001 in Suzhou, China.

In January 2016 Dantherm A/S was acquired by Procuritas, and became the foundation of DanthermGroup.

In 2018 Troy Berg of Dane Manufacturing, a US based firm, purchased the US telecom division of Dantherm, forming Dantherm Cooling.
