= Hydrogen transport =

Hydrogen transport involves the use of technology to transport hydrogen from the point of generation to the point of use.

== Techniques ==
Hydrogen can be transported in a variety of forms.

=== Gas ===
Hydrogen can be transported in gaseous form, typically in a pipeline. Because hydrogen gas is highly reactive, the pipeline or other container must be able to resist interacting with the gas. Hydrogen's low density at atmospheric pressure means that gas transport is suitable only for low volume requirements.

=== Liquid ===
Hydrogen switches to the liquid phase at −253 °C (−423.4 °F). Thus, transporting liquid hydrogen requires sophisticated refrigeration technologies such as cryogenic tanker trucks and liquefaction plants.

=== Compound ===
Hydrogen can be reacted with other elements to form a variety of compounds. This allows it to be transported in either liquid (e.g., water) or solid form. One variation on this concept is to transport atomic silicon, produced using renewable energy. Mixing silicon with water separates water's oxygen from its hydrogen without requiring additional energy. The hydrogen can then be oxidixed with the oxygen (or air) to produce energy (with water as the only byproduct).

=== Mechanochemical ===
Mechanochemistry refers to chemical reactions triggered by mechanical forces as opposed to heat, light, or electric potential. Ball milling can crush material such as boron nitride or graphene, allowing hydrogen gas to be absorbed by the powder, storing the hydrogen. The hydrogen can be released by heating the powder. These techniques offer the potential of substantial net energy savings.

== Safety ==
Hydrogen transport must address various safety threats.

It is highly flammable, requiring little energy to ignite. However, it is low density (0.0837 g/L), which allows leaked gas to rapidly dissipate, rather than accumulate as a higher density gas might, such as chlorine (3.214 g/L).

Liquid hydrogen requires such low temperatures that leaks may solidify other air components such as nitrogen and oxygen. Solid oxygen can mix with liquid hydrogen, forming a mixture that could self-ignite. A jet fire can also ignite.

At high concentrations, hydrogen gas is an asphyxiant, but is not otherwise toxic.

ISO Technical Committee 197 is developing standards governing hydrogen applications. Standards are available onboard systems, fuel tanks and vehicle refueling systems and for production (including electrolysis and steam methane reformers).

Individual jurisdictions such as Italy have developed additional standards.

== See also ==
- Hydrogen transportation
