= Amisan (Gangwon) =

Mountain in South Korea

Coordinates: 37.739°N 128.209°E

Highest point
- Elevation: 960.8 m (3,152 ft)

Geography
- Location: South Korea

Korean name
- Hangul: 아미산
- Hanja: 娥眉山
- RR: Amisan
- MR: Amisan

Amisan (Korean: 아미산) is a mountain in Hongcheon County, Gangwon Province, South Korea. It has an elevation of 960.8 m (3,152 ft).

== See also ==
- List of mountains in Korea
