= Clean Hydrogen Joint Undertaking =

- CHJU

Joint Undertaking overview
- Formed: 2008; 18 years ago, as Fuel Cells and Hydrogen Joint Undertaking
- Headquarters: Avenue de la Toison d’Or 56–60, 4th Floor; 1060 Brussels; Belgium; 50.835070°N 4.354600°E
- Motto: Enabling a renewable hydrogen future
- Annual budget: €168 million (2026)
- Joint Undertaking executive: Valerie Bouillon-Delporte, Executive Director
- Parent department: European Commission (DG RTD)
- Key document: Council Regulation (EU) 2021/2085
- Website: www.clean-hydrogen.europa.eu

The Clean Hydrogen Joint Undertaking (CHJU), also known as Clean Hydrogen Partnership, is a public–private partnership between the European Commission, Hydrogen Europe, and Hydrogen Europe Research under the Horizon Europe framework programme. It supports research, innovation, and deployment activities in hydrogen technologies, with the aim of accelerating the development of a climate-neutral hydrogen economy in Europe.

It succeeds the Fuel Cells and Hydrogen Joint Undertaking (FCH JU), continuing and expanding its mandate under a broader scope aligned with the European Green Deal and the EU hydrogen strategy.

== History ==
The Clean Hydrogen Joint Undertaking was established on 30 November 2021 under Council Regulation (EU) 2021/2085, which created several institutionalised European partnerships under the Horizon Europe research and innovation programme (2021–2027).

It replaced the Fuel Cells and Hydrogen Joint Undertaking (FCH JU), which operated from 2008 to 2021 under the Seventh Framework Programme (FP7) and Horizon 2020. The transition expanded the focus from fuel cells and hydrogen technologies primarily for transport and energy applications to a wider hydrogen ecosystem, including production, distribution, storage, and end-use applications across multiple sectors.

== Objectives ==
The CHJU aims to:

- Contribute to the EU's climate neutrality objective for 2050 and the 2030 climate and energy targets
- Accelerate the development and deployment of clean hydrogen technologies across the full value chain
- Support research and innovation in hydrogen production, distribution, storage, and end-use applications
- Strengthen the European hydrogen value chain and its global competitiveness
- Facilitate the market uptake of innovative clean hydrogen solutions, including technologies with low technology readiness levels
- Support the implementation of the European Hydrogen Strategy and the European Green Deal

== Structure and governance ==
The CHJU is governed by a Governing Board composed of representatives from:

- The European Commission
- Hydrogen Europe (industry association representing private sector partners)
- Hydrogen Europe Research (research organisations and academia)

The Executive Director is responsible for the day-to-day management and implementation of the programme, including funding calls, project selection, and oversight.

== Funding and activities ==
The CHJU funds research and innovation projects through competitive calls for proposals. These projects span the hydrogen value chain, including:

- Renewable hydrogen production (electrolysis)
- Hydrogen storage and transport technologies
- Fuel cell systems
- Industrial applications of hydrogen
- Hydrogen infrastructure development

A key component of its activities is the development of “Hydrogen Valleys”, which are regional ecosystems that integrate the full hydrogen value chain—from production and storage to transport and end use—in real-world demonstration projects supported by the CHJU.

== See also ==
- Clean Aviation Joint Undertaking
- European High Performance Computing Joint Undertaking
- Innovative Health Initiative Joint Undertaking
- SESAR Joint Undertaking
