= Hyundai Hysco =

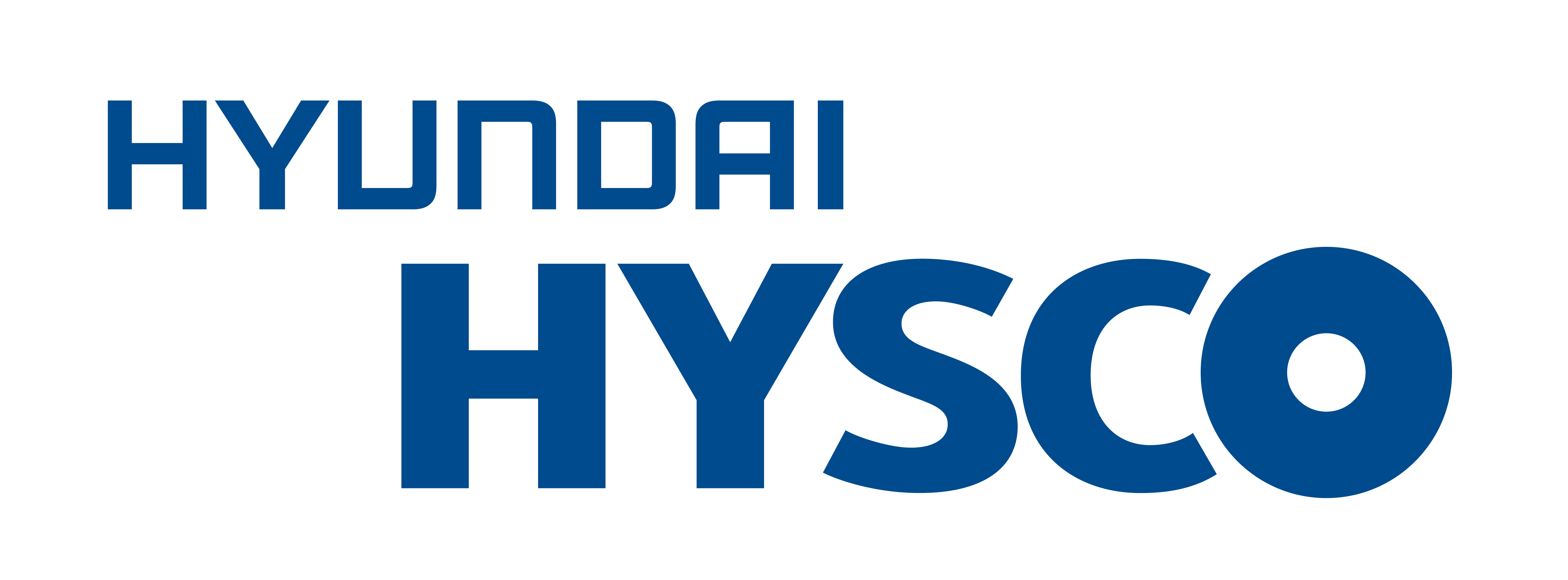
- Native name: 현대하이스코 주식회사
- Company type: Public
- Industry: Steel
- Founded: 1975; 51 years ago
- Defunct: July 1, 2015; 10 years ago
- Fate: Merger with Hyundai Steel
- Headquarters: Ulsan, South Korea
- Products: Steel Pipes, Auto Lightweight Products
- Revenue: ▲4,046 billion KRW (2013)
- Operating income: ▲161 billion KRW (2013)
- Net income: ▲1,608 billion KRW (2013)
- Total assets: ▲2,258 billion KRW (2013)
- Total equity: ▲703 billion KRW (2013)
- Number of employees: 360(2013)
- Parent: Hyundai Motor Group

Hyundai Hysco Co., Ltd. (Korean: 현대하이스코 주식회사) was a steel company of Hyundai Motor Group, headquartered in Ulsan, South Korea. Hysco produced automotive steel sheet products and various steel pipes. The company was merged with Hyundai Steel in July 2015.

== History ==
Hyundai Hysco was established under the name Kyung-il Industrial Co., Ltd. in 1975. The company was renamed to Hyundai Pipe Co., Ltd. in 1980 soon after the completion of its full-scale steel pipe plant in 1979. As a scheme to be a leading steel company in the global market, the company was renamed once again to Hyundai Hysco in February 2001.

In November 1982, two years after the steel pipe plant was built, Hyundai Hysco was awarded the 'US$100 Million Export Tower' in November 1982. In 1997, the company set a new record in the steel industry by producing over 10 million tons of steel pipes.

After taking the largest market share in the steel pipe industry, they entered the market for cold rolled products, which require the highest level of technology among other sectors of the steel industries. Hyundai Hysco has begun the commercial production of cold rolled products in April 1999. Since then, Hyundai Hysco set numerous records in the area of cold rolling, rewriting the history of Korean steel industries. Hyundai Hysco's achievements include the building of a full capacity system in less than one year from the commencement of commercial production and producing 5 million tons of automotive steel products in five years. In 2004, Hyundai Hysco took over an old and standstill works, Hanbo Steel, in Dangjin, in a consortium with Hyundai Steel.

Hyundai Hysco now operates Global Steel Service Center, Automotive Parts Business, Steel Pipe Products, and Resource Development as four core business after partial merger with Hyundai Steel in 2013.

== Operations ==
Hysco's corporate office was located in Seoul, and it also operated works in Ulsan, South Korea with operations worldwide. Hyundai The company operated a steel pipe facility in Korea, eleven overseas processing centers, and three overseas offices internationally.

=== Ulsan Works ===
Ulsan works, located at Ulsan-Si Buk-Gu Yumpo-dong.

=== Overseas Works ===
Hysco has eleven overseas steel service centers in total. There are four steel service centers in China, one in India, four in Europe, two in the US. Hysco also has three sales offices in Houston, LA in US and Tokyo in Japan. Lastly, Hysco operates ASPI office in India to produce automotive pipe with Sumitomo.

== See also ==
- Hyundai Mobis
- Hyundai Motor Company
- Kia Motors
- List of steel producers
