= COGEN Europe =

European advocacy group

The European Association for the Promotion of Cogeneration (COGEN Europe) is a European advocacy group based in Brussels, Belgium that promotes the practice of cogeneration in energy production. The group acts as a liaison between its member companies and European Union energy organizations and committees.

Cogeneration, or Combined Heat and Power (CHP), is a key component of the energy efficiency and decarbonisation strategy of the European Union. CHP systems simultaneously generate electricity and usable heat through a single, highly efficient process. By capturing and utilising heat that would otherwise be wasted, CHP directly meets thermal energy demands while significantly reducing primary energy consumption. This efficiency translates into substantial cuts in CO₂ emissions, making CHP a powerful tool in the transition to a low-carbon energy system.

COGEN Europe was established in 1993 as a not-for-profit organisation (ASBL - association sans but lucratif in French and VZW - vereniging zonder winstoogmerk in Dutch) during the time that the European Union adopted the SAVE Directive. Members of this organisation are national industry associations and companies promoting cogeneration across EU Member States and beyond.

COGEN Europe was involved in various EU-funded projects, including as a coordinator of the two largest EU projects to rollout fuel cell micro-cogeneration (FC mCHP), such as ene.field and PACE.

In 2024, COGEN Europe reported a turnover of approximately €410,000, of which €107,756 came from EU grants.

== See also ==
- COGEN World Coalition
