= Baltzar von Platen (inventor) =

Swedish engineer and inventor (1898–1984)

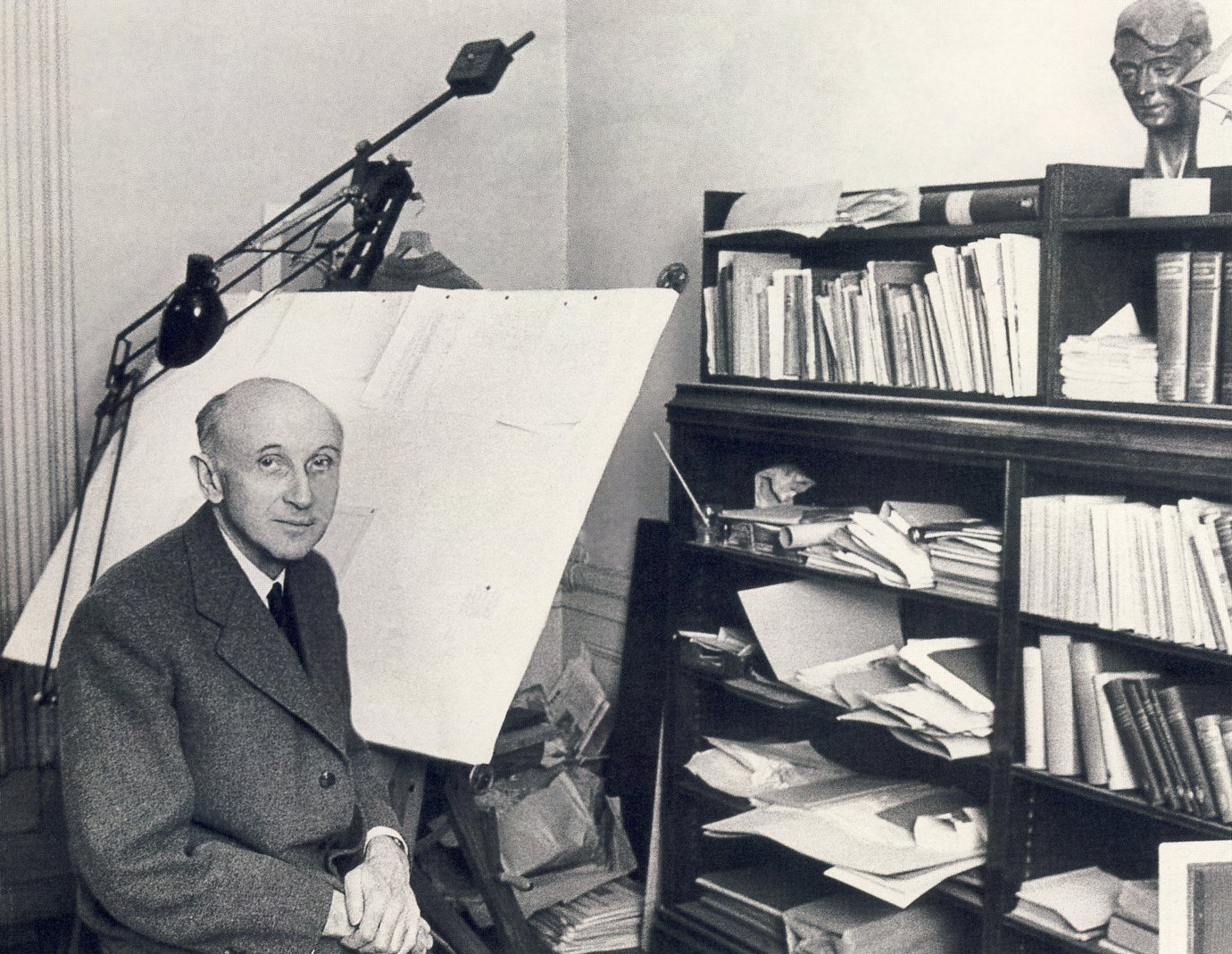
- Baltzar von Platen in his office, in 1960
- Born: 24 February 1898; Malmö, Sweden
- Died: 29 April 1984 (aged 86); Ystad, Skåne, Sweden
- Education: KTH Royal Institute of Technology
- Known for: Invention of the gas absorption refrigerator
- Awards: John Price Wetherill Medal; Adelsköld Medal; Polhem Prize; Adelsköld Medal

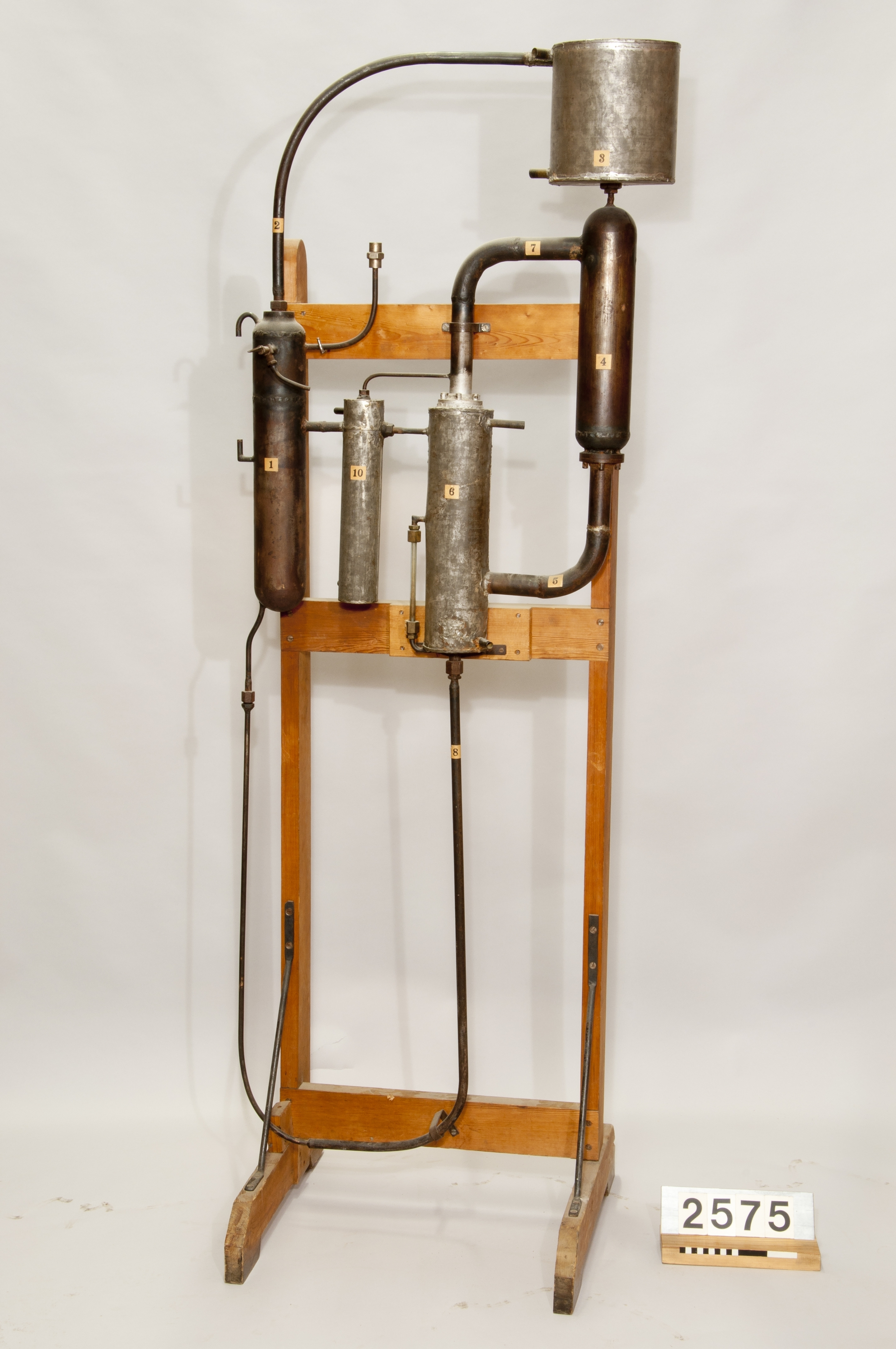
This prototype cooling device invented by Baltzar von Platen and Carl Munters in 1922 became the basis for a lot of refrigerators produced in Sweden and elsewhere.

Baltzar von Platen (24 February 1898 – 29 April 1984) was a Swedish engineer and inventor.

== Biography ==
Baltzar von Platen born in Malmö, Sweden. He was the son of Philip Ludvig von Platen and Eva Hedvig Ingeborg Ehrenborg. He first studied mathematics, physics, and astronomy at Lund University.

Together with inventor and entrepreneur Carl Munters (1897–1989), he was the inventor of the gas absorption refrigerator in 1922 while they were both Swedish engineering students at the KTH Royal Institute of Technology in Stockholm, Sweden. The Platen-Munters design could operate without a pump. The technique produced "cold" from a heat source such as propane, electricity, or kerosene. In 1923, production by AB Arctic began. In 1925, AB Arctic was purchased by Electrolux, which began selling them worldwide. In 1925, American manufacturer Servel purchased the rights to the Swedish patent for a continuous absorption refrigerator and started to focus on the gas refrigeration market. The company manufactured refrigerators and was the only U.S. manufacturer for many years.

Baltzar von Platen and Carl Munters both received the Polhem Prize (Polhemspriset) awarded by Swedish Association of Graduate Engineers in 1925. Baltzar von Platen was awarded the Franklin Institute John Price Wetherill Medal in 1932. He was awarded the Adelsköld Medal (Adelsköldska medaljen) in gold from the Royal Swedish Academy of Sciences during 1940. Von Platen also worked with ASEA, Sweden's major electrical company, on the development of a process which used heat and pressure to produce diamonds. Von Platen left the project before it succeeded in producing the first synthetic diamonds in 1953.
