= Direct coupled =

Direct coupled or Direct-coupled may refer to:

- Direct-coupled amplifier
- Direct-coupled transistor logic
- Direct coupled (applied to an engine), drives a machine directly without intervening belts, chains, or gears
