= Polhem Prize =

The Polhem Prize (Polhemspriset) is a Swedish award for a high-level technological innovation or an ingenious solution to a technical problem. The innovation must be available and shown competitive on the open market. The prize is awarded by Swedish Association of Graduate Engineers (Sveriges Ingenjörer) (formerly Civilingenjörsförbundet and Svenska Teknologföreningen) The prize is named after Swedish scientist, inventor and industrialist Christopher Polhem (1661–1751).

== Laureates ==
Year	Laureate	Rationale
1878	Werner Cronquist	
1879	Otto Fahnehjelm	
1881	Elis Bedoire	
1882	Carl Ångström	
1895	Ernst Danielson	
1895	Johan Gustaf Richert	
1900	Martin Ekenberg	
1900	Johan August Brinell	
1904	Carl Lundgren	
1904	Sigurd Nauckhoff	
1911	Richard Ekwall	
1921	Franz Ragnar Berwald and Bo Hellström	
1925	Baltzar von Platen and Carl Munters	
1930	Erik Öman and Elis Göth	
1930	Mauritz Vos and Håkan Sterky	
1936	Walter Kjellman	
1936	Lennart Forsén	
1940	Waloddi Weibull	A statistical theory of the strength of materials
1945	Conny Palm	
1945	Olof Rydbeck	The propagation of radio waves
1950	Hannes Alfvén	
1950	K H Gustavson	
1955	Gunnar Pleijel	
1955	Georg Drougge	The continuous variation of the Mach number in a supersonic tunnel
1960	Ragnar Lundholm	
1960	K Joel Lindberg	Wool fabrics as garment construction materials
1960	Nils Hast	The measurement of rock pressure in mines
1969	Bertil Stålhane	
1974	Per-Anders Persson	
1974	Sigvard Strandh	
1979	Bengt Gunnar Magnusson	
1980	Georg Vogl	
1981	Sven Brohult	
1982	Torkel Wallmark	
1983	Ove Pettersson	
1984	Arne Berlie and Hadar Lidén	
1985	Kåre Hannerz	
1986	Sven Benktander and Sture Åsberg	
1987	Ove Fernö	
1988	Lennart Gustavsson and Leif Lindau	
1989	Olle Siwersson	
1990	Harry Frank	
1991	Karl Dunkers	
1992	Per Siversson	
1993	Claes Ericsson	
1994	Mikael Karlsson and Martin Gren	
1995	Håkan Lans	
1997	Hans Hellsten	
1999	Gunnar Asplund	
2001	Mats Leijon	
2003	Ove Öhman	
2005	Lars Ingvarsson	
2007	Karl Gustaf Derman	
2009	Laila Ohlgren	Nordic Mobile Telephone dialing procedure
2011	Georgios Psaros	
2013	Petra Wadström	Solvatten
2014	Hans Björklund	
2015	John Elvesjö and Mårten Skogö	
2016	Lennart Lindblad	
2017	Daniel Stenberg	cURL
2018	Lars Stigsson and Valeri Naydenov	
2019	Peter Halldin, Hans von Holst and Svein Kleiven	
2020	Ludvig Strigeus	μTorrent, Spotify
2021	Rickard Öste and Angeliki Triantafyllou	
2022	Staffan Gestrelius	
