= Laila Ohlgren =

Swedish telecommunications engineer, inventor

- Born: Ragnhild Laila Lillemor Andersson; 17 November 1937
- Died: 6 January 2014 (aged 76)
- Occupation: Engineer
- Children: 2

Ragnhild Laila Lillemor Ohlgren (née Andersson; 17 November 1937 – 6 January 2014) was a Swedish telecommunications engineer who is seen as the developer of mobile telephony together with Östen Mäkitalo, both engineers at Telia. In particular, she successfully introduced storage of the telephone number to be dialed in the phone's microprocessor so that connection could be achieved by pressing the call button. This avoided transmission breakages caused by obstacles such as trees during more lengthy traditional dialing. The approach was subsequently adopted worldwide. For her efforts, in 2009 she became the first woman to be awarded the Polhem Prize for technical innovation.

== Early life ==
Born in Tingshammer just outside Stockholm on 17 November 1937, Ragnhild Laila Lillemor Andersson was the daughter of Johan Arvid Andersson and his wife Sally Elisabeth born Carlsson. The family name was subsequently changed to Tingshammar. She was brought up by her single mother in difficult conditions. She attended the public school in Kungsholmen. While still a teenager, she met the baritone Bo Viktor Ohlgren (1933–2015) who was active in the Mission Covenant Church of Sweden. They married in 1959. Together they had two children, Magnus and Håkan, who both became engineers.

Thanks to her father-in-law who worked for the Swedish telecoms' authority Televerket, she began working there in 1956 while continuing her education at home in the evenings. In this way, she succeeded in passing not only the school matriculation examination, but was also able to graduate as an engineer. At Televerket where she was the only woman in her department, she was promoted to project leader with involvement in the development of mobile telephone technology. From 1969, she was working with Östen Mäkitalo in connection with the Nordic Mobile Telephone (NMT) project.

== Inventing the call button ==
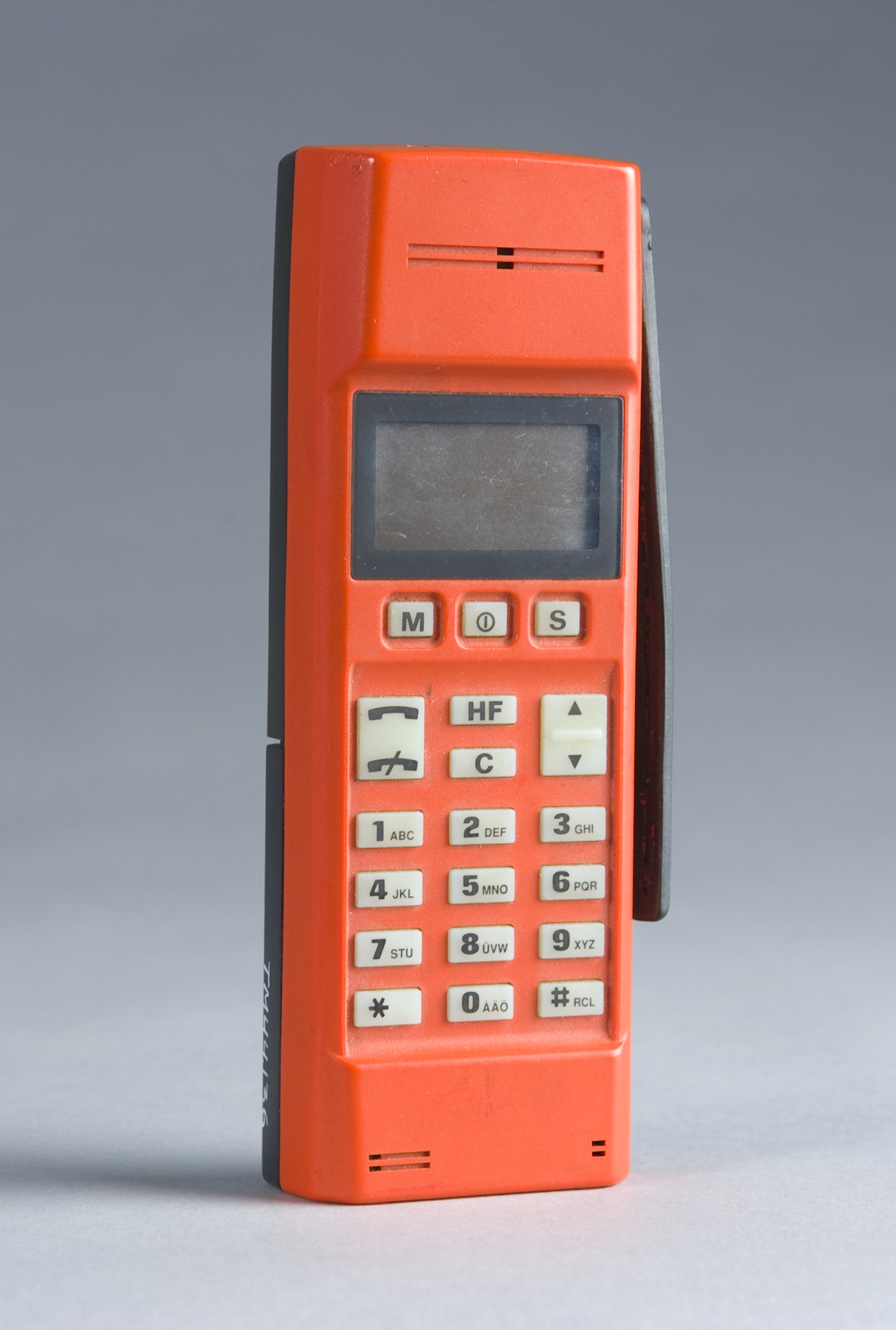
Early Ericsson Hotline phone with "call button" (top left)

When final tests of the NMT system were being conducted in 1979 just a few days before a key meeting in Kalmar, it suddenly occurred to Laila Ohlgren that the frequent breakdowns in dialing caused by objects such as trees when on the move could be overcome by using the phone's microprocessor to store the number to be dialed. A call button could then be used to make the connection by combining all the digits in one go.

Although it was Whit weekend, she called Östen and asked him if they should drive around Stockholm and test her idea out. As reported in Ny Teknik, she explained, "One of us drove and the other made calls, and we continued the whole weekend. We perhaps made a thousand connections in order to get a reasonable statistical basis to see if the new solution worked. And it did." The approach proved to represent an important improvement in performance and was adopted as a component of NMT, the first integrated mobile telephony system in the world. Ohlgren's call button innovation became a world standard. Ohlgren continued to be employed at Televerket, later known as Telia, heading 750 employees in their insurance branch in Haninge until her retirement in 2005.

In 2009, Laila Ohlgren became the first woman to be honoured with the Polhem Prize from the Swedish Association of Graduate Engineers, which included an award of 250,000 Swedish crowns (or around $28,000). She died on 6 January 2014 and is buried in Skogskyrkogården Cemetery in Gamla Enskede.
