= Solvatten =

Solar water-purification device

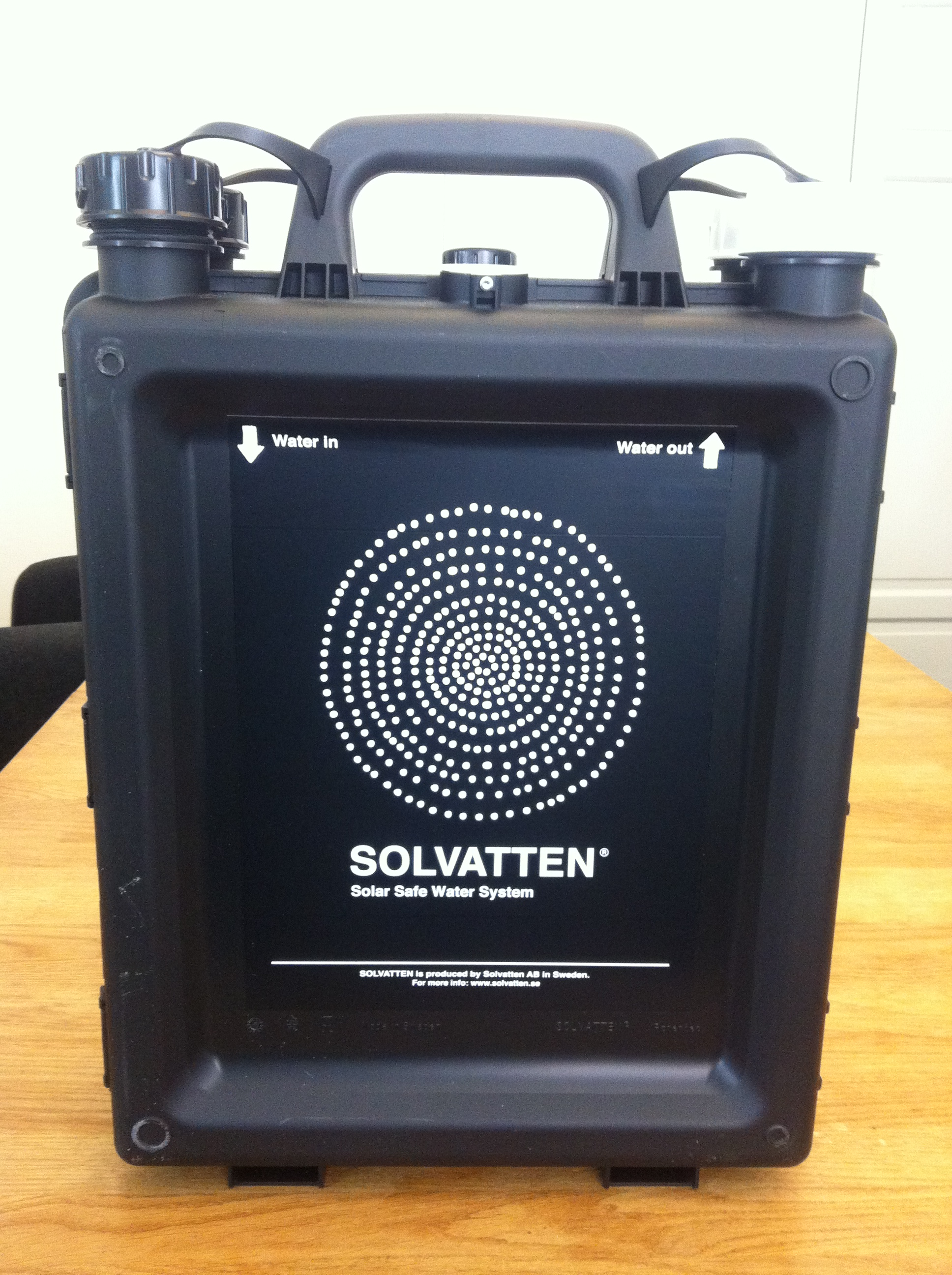
- A Solvatten unit
- Founded: 2006, 2013
- Type: Aktiebolag, Foundation
- Location: Stockholm, Sweden
- Region served: Worldwide
- Key people: Petra Wadström
- Website: solvatten.org

Solvatten is a simple portable device which uses sunlight to purify water for drinking. It was invented by Petra Wadström and was intended mainly for domestic use in the developing world. Provided the sun is strong enough, it takes two to six hours to produce ten litres of drinking water. It works through a combination of the natural ultra-violet radiation and heat (infra-red radiation) in sunlight, and also incorporates a filter mesh.

The device is marketed by a company, Solvatten AB, founded in 2006.

== The device ==
The Solvatten device consists of two hinged parts which can open in the manner of a book, revealing two transparent plastic surfaces. Each half can hold five litres of water. When the device is placed in the sun, the plastic allows ultra-violet radiation to reach the water, which is also heated by the sunlight. It becomes safe to drink within two to six hours. Use of the device can reduce the use of wood to boil water, thus acting to limit deforestation and carbon dioxide emissions.

== Reception ==
The device has received several awards:

- 2009: World Wildlife Fund, "Climate Solver"
- 2011: International Green Awards, "Best Green New Product Innovation"
- 2011: Swedish-American Chamber of Commerce, SACC New York-Deloitte Green Award
- 2013: The Energy Globe Award Mali
- 2013: Sveriges Ingenjörer, The Polhem Prize
