= Filippa Knutsson =

Swedish fashion designer (born 1965)

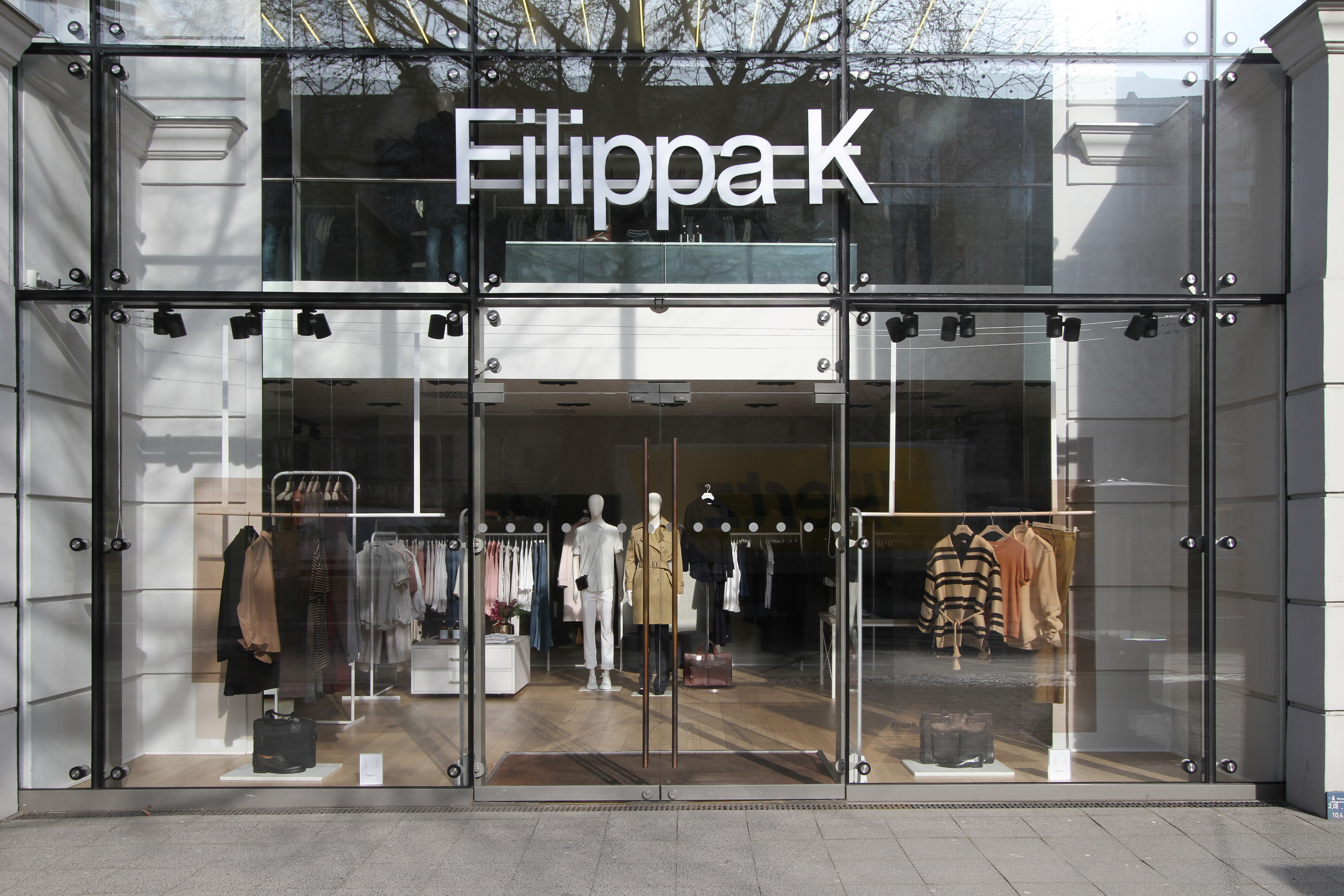
A Filippa K store in Berlin, 2016

Filippa Martina Knutsson (born 12 November 1965 in Stockholm) is a Swedish fashion designer. She is the owner of the fashion brand Filippa K, founded in 1993, and runs it with her former husband Patrik Kihlborg. She has been called "a household name" and "a superstar" in Sweden and much of Europe.

== Biography ==
Knutsson co-founded Filippa K with Patrik Kihlborg and Karin Segerblom in 1993.

In 2002, her brother Lukas died while wingsuit flying.

Knutsson was awarded a Patriotiska Sällskapets Näringslivsmedalj in 2010 by the Royal Patriotic Society for the entrepreneurship that has been part of her Swedish business development. The brand Filippa K has been awarded with the Swedish design prize Guldknappen. She was also awarded the Gunilla Arhéns Förebildspris 2008 and was named "Woman of the Year" 2012 by the Swedish Women's Educational Association.

In January 2017, Knutsson returned to Filippa K as creative director and will be based in London, taking over from Nina Bogstedt, who had led the creative team for 19 years. The company Filippa K defines their structure as "a curious and conscious brand" that recognises innovative sustainability as its guide to growth.

Knutsson lives in London.
