= Swedish Women's Educational Association =

Non-profit organization in Sweden

The Swedish Women's Educational Association, referred to as SWEA but officially designated SWEA International, Inc., is a global non-profit organization and a network for Swedish and Swedish-speaking women who reside or have resided outside of Sweden.

SWEA is represented in many locations throughout the world and plays a major role in the Swedish State Department's emergency management plan.

SWEA is a politically and religiously independent organization.

== Organization ==
SWEA International is the largest non-profit organization promoting Sweden outside of Sweden with the goal of promoting the Swedish language and spreading Swedish culture and tradition.

Each year, SWEA International awards three scholarships of US$15,000 each:

- The Scholarship for Research Related to the Swedish Language, Literature, and Society
- The Agneta and Gunnar Nilsson Scholarship for the Study of Intercultural Relations
- The Sigrid Paskell Scholarship in the Performing Arts

In addition, SWEA International selects a Swedish Woman of the Year annually.

Locally, SWEA International's chapters make donations and present scholarships that total about 2 million Swedish kronor (US$250,000) per year.

SWEA International offers its members assistance during the process of relocating and transitioning between countries. Additionally, the organization welcomes and provides support to members upon their return to Sweden.

SWEA International has approximately 6,000 women members in approximately 70 local chapters in about 30 countries on five continents.

SWEA International's chairman since 2024 is Charlotte Rigby Fors.

== History ==
In 1979, SWEA International was founded in Los Angeles by Agneta Nilsson. Princess Christina Mrs. Magnuson is the association's honorary president.

== Swedish Woman of the Year ==
Since 1989, SWEA International has selected a Swedish Woman of the Year (abbreviated ÅSK, for Årets Svenska Kvinna) annually. The recipient is announced during SWEA's annual meeting each spring and is recognized during the annual "Sweden dinner" organized each summer by one of the chapters located in Sweden. The recipient must be a Swedish woman who, through her accomplishments, has represented and brought attention to the Sweden of today in the greater world.

The following women have been recognized as Swedish Woman of the Year:

- 1989: Ulla Wachtmeister
- 1990: Birgitta Wistrand
- 1991, 1992: Undistributed
- 1993: Anne-Marie De Geer and Ingrid Croneborg-Bergman
- 1994: Lise-Lotte Lübeck-Erixon
- 1995: Ingrid Karlsson
- 1996: Undistributed
- 1997: Ulla-Brita Palm
- 1998: Dorothea Rosenblad
- 1999: Kerstin Nordquist-Lane
- 2000: Maria Nyström Reuterswärd
- 2001: Drottning Silvia
- 2002: Eva Olofsson
- 2003: Ewa Kumlin
- 2004: Barbro Sachs-Osher
- 2005: Ingrid le Roux
- 2006: Tina Nordström
- 2007: Marianne Forssblad
- 2008: Inger Schuberth
- 2009: Agneta Nilsson, founder of SWEA International, Inc.
- 2010: Kjerstin Dellert
- 2011: Christina Lampe Önnerud
- 2012: Filippa Knutsson
- 2013: Mona Henning
- 2014: Nina Stemme
- 2015: Petra Wadström
- 2016: Maria Strømme
- 2017: Nikoo Bazsefidpay
- 2018: Ulrika Hydman Vallien
- 2019: Greta Thunberg
- 2020: Pia Sundhage
- 2021: Victoria, Crown Princess of Sweden
- 2022: Undistributed
- 2023: Anne-Marie Eklund Löwinder
- 2024: Lise Tamm
- 2025: Elly Reinolds
