= Curl-loader =

Open-source software performance testing tool

curl-loader
- Developer: Open-source project
- Stable release: 0.56 / 10 January 2012; 14 years ago
- Operating system: Linux
- Type: Software performance testing
- License: GPLv2
- Website: curl-loader.sourceforge.net
- Repository: svn.code.sf.net/p/curl-loader/code/

curl-loader is an open-source software performance testing tool.

This C-based tool is developed and maintained by Dr. Robert Iakobashvili and Michael Moser.

== Features ==
curl-loader is capable of simulating application behavior of hundreds of thousands of HTTP/HTTPS and FTP/FTPS clients, each with its own source IP-address. In contrast to other tools, curl-loader uses real client protocol stacks, namely, HTTP and FTP stacks of libcurl and TLS/SSL of openSSL, and simulates user behavior with support for login and authentication flavors.

It can run up to 2,500–100,000 and more virtual loading clients from a single curl-loader process. The actual number of virtual clients may be several times higher, limited mainly by memory availability. Each virtual client loads traffic from its "personal" source IP-address, or from the "common" IP-address shared by all clients, or from IP-addresses shared by some clients where a limited set of shared IP-addresses can be used by a batch of clients.

According to the project's SourceForge repository, the most recent stable release is version 0.56, which was published on 10 January 2012. Curl-loader is a C program for sending load to a server using the HTTP, HTTPS, FTP, and FTPS protocols. It is a load-testing tool for Linux based on the curl library, using libcurl for HTTP/FTP protocols and OpenSSL for TLS/SSL.

Major features:

- Ramp-up of the number of virtual clients at loading start in either automatic or manual mode
- IPv4 and IPv6 addresses and URIs
- HTTP 1.1 GET, POST, PUT, DELETE, and HEAD, including file upload operations
- HTTP user authentication login with POST or GET+POST methods, supporting unique configurable usernames and passwords per virtual client, configurable posted strings (post-forms), or loading credentials from a tokens text file
- HTTP POST/GET forms with up to 16 tokens filled from a tokens text file
- HTTP user logoff with POST, GET+POST, or GET (cookies); POST logoff with configurable posted string (post-forms)
- HTTP multipart form data POST-ing as in RFC 1867
- HTTP Web and Proxy Authentication (HTTP 401 and 407 responses) with Basic, Digest (RFC 2617), and NTLM
- HTTP 3xx redirections with an unlimited number of redirections
- HTTP cookies and DNS caches
- FTP passive and active modes, and FTP upload
- Full customization of client request HTTP/FTP headers
- Transfer limit rate for each client download or upload operation on a per-URL basis
- URL fetching probability
- TCP connection reuse or re-establishment on a per-URL basis
- Unlimited configurable number of URLs, mixing HTTP, HTTPS, FTP, and FTPS URLs in a single batch (test plan) configuration
- Connection establishment timers for each URL
- URL completion timers monitoring and enforcement for each client
- Inter/after URL "sleeping" timers, including random timers taken from a configurable interval
- Logfile with tracing activities for each virtual client
- Logging of responses (headers and bodies) to files
- Pre-cooked batch configuration (test plan) examples
- Load status at console and with output to file
- Status and statistics for each virtual client logged to file

The goal of curl-loader is to deliver an open-source software performance testing client-side solution as an alternative to Spirent Avalanche and IXIA IxLoad. Curl-loader is normally paired with nginx or Apache web server as the server-side.

== See also ==
- Software performance testing
- Performance Engineering
- Software testing
