= Östen Mäkitalo =

Swedish electrical engineer (1938–2011)

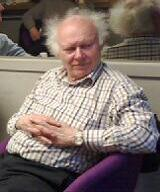
- Östen Mäkitalo (2007)
- Born: 27 August 1938; Koutojärvi, Övertorneå Municipality, Sweden
- Died: 16 June 2011 (aged 72)
- Education: Royal Institute of Technology
- Engineering career
- Projects: Telecommunication
- Significant design: GSM
- Awards: H. M. The King's Medal

Östen Mäkitalo (27 August 1938 – 16 June 2011) was a Swedish electrical engineer. He is considered to be one of the most important developers in modern times together with Laila Ohlgren, both engineers at Telia. Together they developed the Nordic Mobile Telephone (NMT) system and were the leading figures, representing Telia and Sweden, in the meetings with the other Nordic countries to find a common standard. Later they developed GSM and led the meetings to find a European and later world standard for mobile communication. They are many times considered the developer of the cellular phone and mobile telephony.

== Education and occupation ==
Mäkitalo was born in Koutojärvi, Sweden, and obtained a master's degree in electrical engineering from Royal Institute of Technology (KTH), while studying for a time he employed as a training assistant and lecturer at the Department of Physics at KTH. He started his professional career in 1961 at Televerket (now merged with TeliaSonera), the Swedish Telecommunications Administration, where he developed the first expansion compressor for high-quality sound. In the early 1970s, he was accepted as a PhD student at KTH, with Tele Transmission theory as a major and a minor in mathematics. He was a visiting professor at KTH since 2005. He was the elected member of Royal Swedish Academy of Engineering Sciences.

== Research and inventions ==
Mäkitalo assisted the development of first ever first generation cellular system and was also a key figure in the development of GSM. Mäkitalo was the part of the group that developed the world's first countrywide paging system with the possibility of sending messages. In addition, he has partaken in the development of the technology for digital TV sound and digital terrestrial TV. Mäkitalo held about 20 patents, including one on a cellular system with roaming and handover from 1971 (the year after Bell labs applied for patent on a similar system). He was an honorary doctor at Chalmers University of Technology.

== Awards and honors ==
Mäkitalo won numerous awards and honors, some of them were:

- 1987 - IVA's gold medal for the development of mobile phone technology.
- 1991 - Received honorary doctorate at Chalmers University of Technology.
- 1994 - KTH Grand Prize by The Royal Institute of Technology (KTH) for Pioneering Research in the Field of Analogue and Digital Radio Technique.
- 2001 - H. M. The King's Medal from the King of Sweden for important contributions in the field of mobile telephone.
