= J. Torkel Wallmark =

Swedish electrical engineer

John Torkel Wallmark
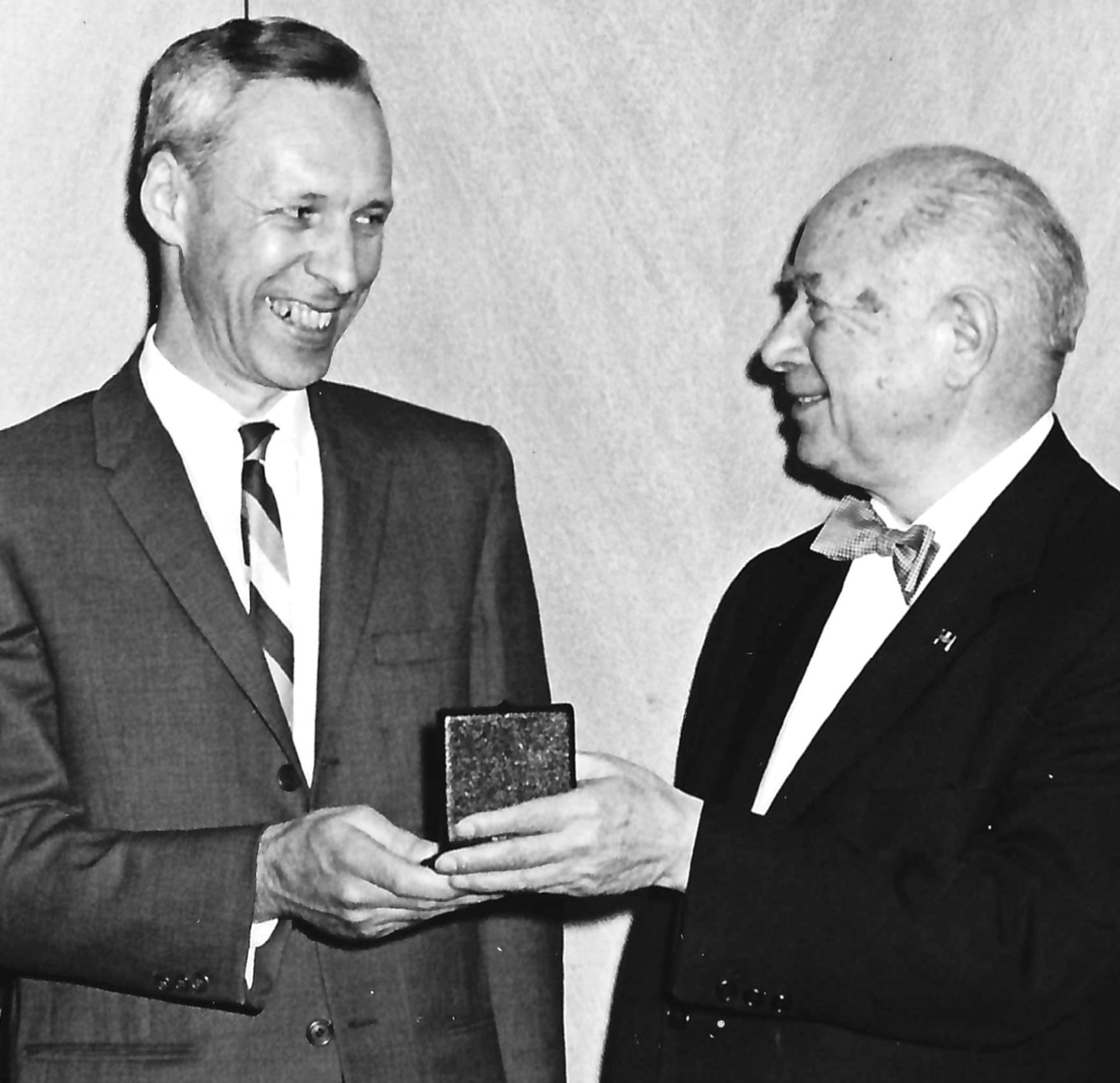
- Wallmark receiving (on behalf of the team) the RCA 1964 David Sarnoff Outstanding Team Award In Science.
- Born: 4 June 1919; Stockholm, Sweden
- Died: 5 February 2007 (aged 87)
- Known for: Thin-film transistor Trochotron; Unipolar direct-coupled transistor logic
- Awards: Cedergren Medal (1984); Polhem Prize (1982)

John Torkel Wallmark (4 June 1919 – 5 February 2007) was a Swedish electrical engineer and researcher in semiconductor electronics and innovation technology.

Torkel Wallmark was born in Stockholm. He graduated from KTH Royal Institute of Technology in 1944, became licentiate of engineering in 1947 and doctor of technology in 1953. He was a researcher at the Radio Corporation of America in Princeton, US 1953–1964 and a member of the team awarded the RCA 1964 David Sarnoff Outstanding Team Award in Science.

In 1964, he returned to Sweden as a professor in solid state electronics at Chalmers University of Technology. (The professorship was initially named electron physics III.) In 1983 he transferred to a personal professorship in innovation technology at Chalmers, which was the first in this subject area in Sweden. Wallmark has contributed to the establishment of seed companies that are based on research performed at Swedish universities of technology, especially at the Chalmers University of Technology.

Torkel Wallmark became a member of the Royal Swedish Academy of Engineering Sciences in 1970 and a member of the Royal Swedish Academy of Sciences in 1984. He was awarded the 1982 Polhem Award for research in the field of solid state electronics, the KTH Foundation's Large Award in 1989 for building an innovation center at Chalmers and the Royal Swedish Academy of Engineering Sciences major gold medal in 1989 with the motivation "for his internationally outstanding efforts in semiconductor technology and his incentive for industrial new enterprise".

== See also ==
- CMOS
