= Platen (Pomeranian family) =

Coat of Arms of the Platen family

The House of Platen is a feudal noble family originally from Pomerania. The branch of Platen-Hallermund was a mediatized one and as such was part of the small circle of families that belonged to the High nobility in Germany.

== History ==
The family's earliest known ancestor is Otto "cum plata", who was first mentioned in 1252 as Vogt of Jaromar II, Prince of Rügen. The line of Platen-Hallermund (officially a Platen family, but represented a bastard line of the Guelphs), which was raised to the rank of Imperial count in 1689 by Leopold I, Holy Roman Emperor, acquired the County of Hallermund in 1704 and therefore belonged to the high nobility since 1709. As a consequence of the Napoleonic Wars the family was mediatized by Westphalia in 1807 and was later ceded to Hanover in 1813. The male line of the Counts of Platen-Hallermund exist until today and live in Germany.

== Swedish branch ==
Several branches of the family live in Sweden, where members have been noted statesmen and high officials. A branch of the family was naturalized as Swedish nobility in 1751 (adliga ätten 1922). Two branches of this line have since been elevated to baronial status. Several members of the family belonging to branches which have not been introduced at the House of Nobility also live in Sweden; these branches are part of the unintroduced nobility.

== Famous members ==
- Baltzar von Platen (1766–1829)
- Baltzar von Platen (inventor)
