= Petra Wadström =

Swedish inventor

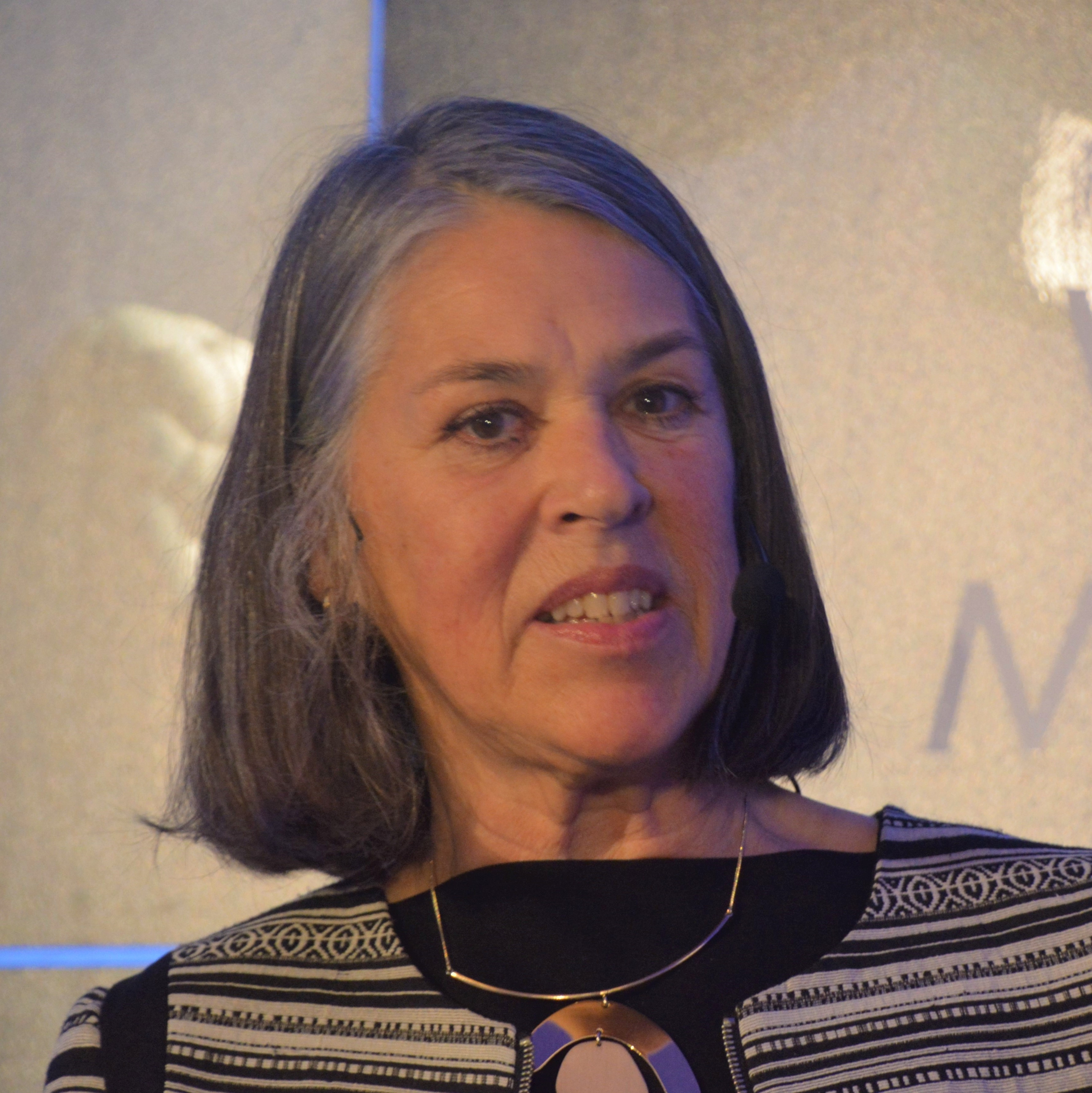
- Wadström in 2018
- Born: 20 February 1952 (age 74)
- Education: Karolinska Institute
- Occupations: Inventor, designer
- Known for: Solvatten
- Spouse: Carl
- Children: 4

Petra Wadström (born 20 February 1952) is a Swedish inventor of a water purification device called Solvatten, which is a portable device that heats and purifies dirty local water in locations with access to significant amounts of sunshine.

== Life and work ==
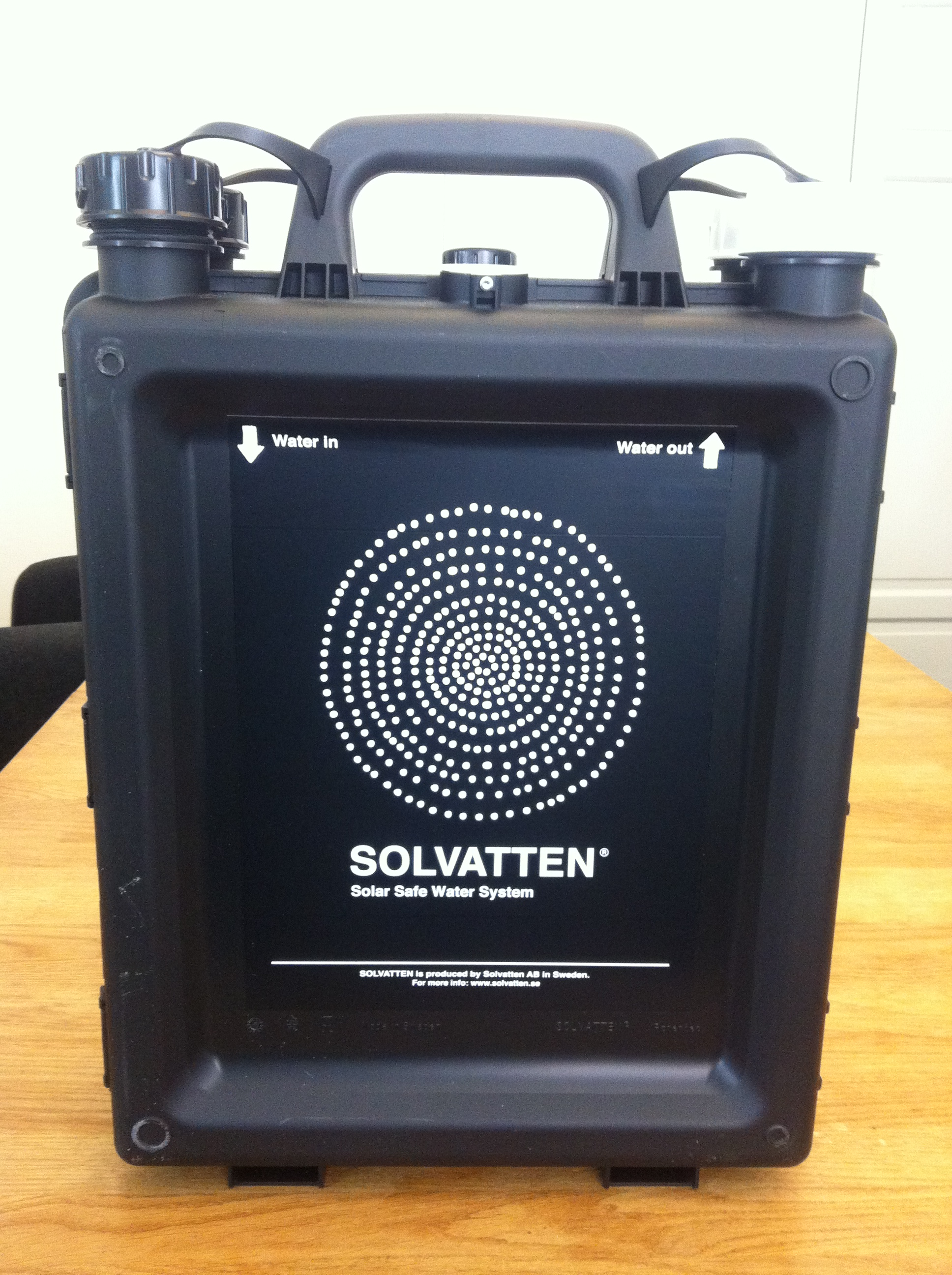
Solvatten water purification device

Wadström did biochemical medical research at the Karolinska Institute in Stockholm, Sweden, and then moved to Basel, Switzerland, to join a team exploring DNA research.

While living in Australia for a year in the late 1990s, Wadström tackled one problem of families living off-the-grid, lack of access to clean water. She chose to use the power of intense sunshine.

After returning to Sweden, she designed and built a device resembling a portable black container that opens like a book in direct sunshine to maximize the effect of the sun and UVB radiation. The water inside can heat to 75 degrees Celsius (167 degrees Fahrenheit), hot enough to destroy any microbes in the water and render the water drinkable. During the invention process, she built prototypes at home and tested them using wastewater from local treatment plants.

Wadström's portable water treatment and water heating system can be used by people living in households with access to sunshine but no access to electricity. By using the durable Solvatten unit, families who live off-the-grid can transform water from local sources, which may not be potable, into clean hot water that can be consumed safely warm or cold.

Wadström is a founder and Senior Advisor of the social enterprise Solvatten AB, which was established in Sweden in 2013 to expand access to the device around the world.

== Selected awards ==
- 2008, Skapa Prize
- 2009, Wadström was also one of the eight nominees when Veckans Affärer awarded its Green Capitalist of the Year award.
- 2013, Polhem Prize
- 2015, Swedish Woman of the Year
- 2022, KTH Great Prize

== Personal life ==
Wadström and husband Carl have four children.
