= Daniel Stenberg =

Swedish software developer

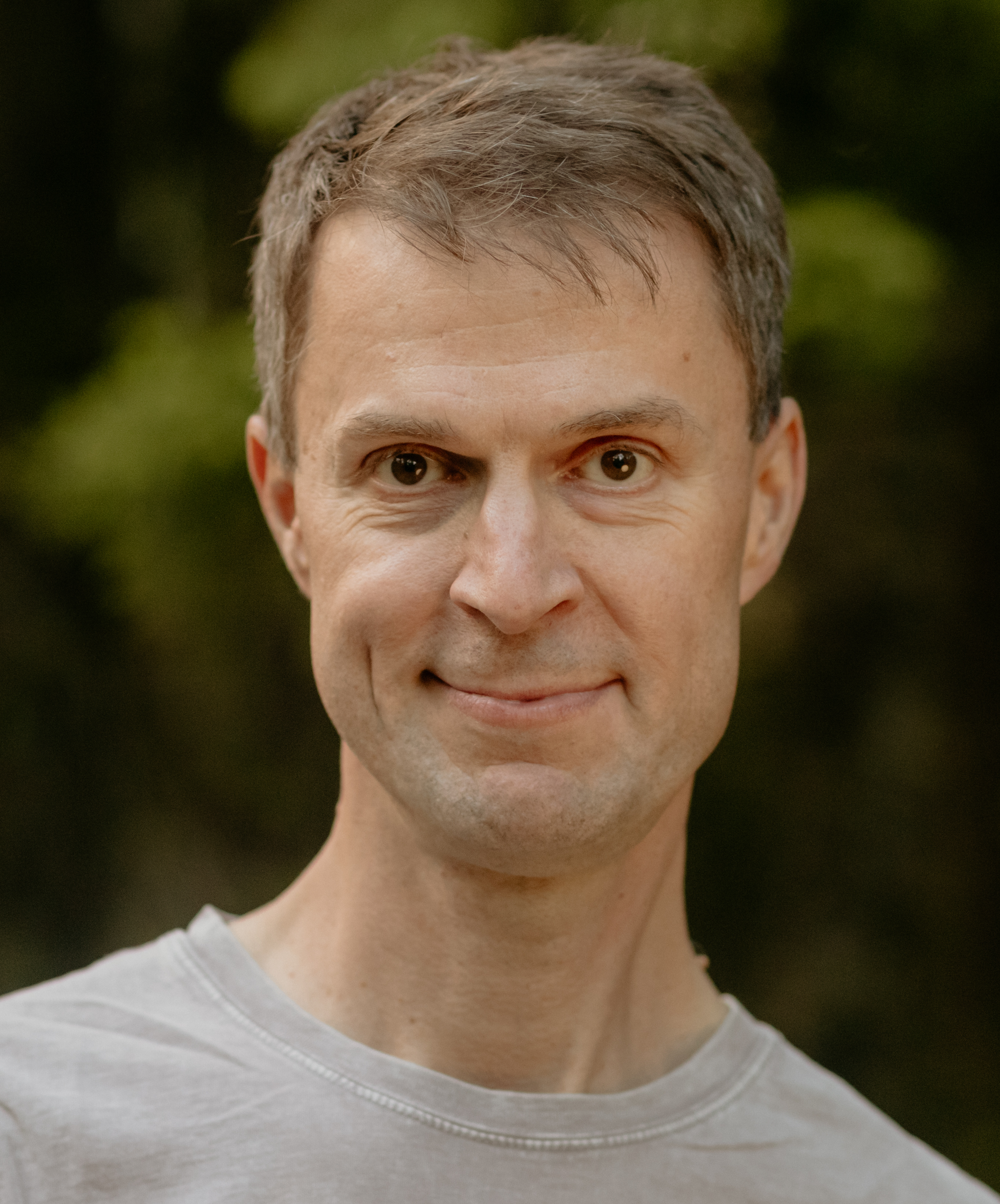
- Daniel Stenberg in 2021
- Born: November 23, 1970 (age 55)
- Other name: bagder
- Occupation: Computer Scientist/Programmer
- Notable work: cURL, Rockbox
- Daniel Stenberg's voice Published March 2022
- Website: daniel.haxx.se

Magnus Daniel Stenberg is a Swedish software developer. He received the 2017 Polhem Prize (for a high-level technological innovation or an ingenious solution to a technical problem) for his work on the cURL utility.

Stenberg was born and raised in Huddinge, a suburb south of Sweden's capital Stockholm. He created the utility which, after various name and license changes, became known as cURL which is available under the cURL License (based on the MIT License).

From 2013 to 2018, he worked for Mozilla. In February 2019, Stenberg joined wolfSSL to offer commercial support for cURL and to work on cURL as full-time as possible. He is active in the Internet Engineering Task Force (IETF), a member of the working groups for the HTTP/2 and QUIC network protocols, and contributed to several technical Requests for Comments (RFCs).

In April 2023, he became a member of the Polhemsrådet, the Polhem Prize's committee.

In October 2025, he was awarded the Gold Medal by the Royal Swedish Academy of Engineering Sciences (IVA) for his work in open-source software, specifically cURL. The citation states:

Daniel Stenberg, software developer, is awarded IVA’s Gold Medal for his outstanding contributions to software development, where he has played a central role in internet infrastructure and open source software. Through his work with curl – a tool now used by billions of devices worldwide – he has enabled reliable and secure data transfer over the internet, not only between traditional computer programmes but also across smartphones, vehicles, satellites and spacecraft.

— Royal Swedish Academy of Engineering Sciences

== See also ==
- Wget
