= Direct-coupled transistor logic =

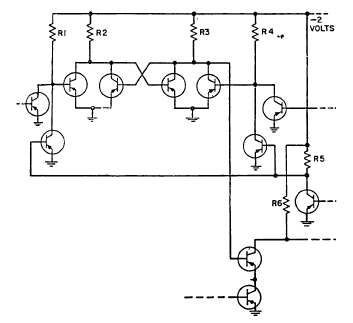
Direct-coupled transistor logic (DCTL) circuit of the Leprechaun computer

Direct-coupled transistor logic (DCTL) is similar to resistor–transistor logic (RTL), but the input transistor bases are connected directly to the collector outputs without any base resistors. Consequently, DCTL gates have fewer components, are more economical, and are simpler to fabricate onto integrated circuits than RTL gates. Unfortunately, DCTL has much smaller signal levels, has more susceptibility to ground noise, and requires matched transistor characteristics. The transistors are also heavily overdriven; this is a good feature in that it reduces the saturation voltage of the output transistors, but it also slows the circuit down due to a high stored charge in the base. Gate fan-out is limited due to "current hogging": if the transistor base–emitter voltages (V_{BE}) are not well matched, then the base–emitter junction of one transistor may conduct most of the input drive current at such a low base–emitter voltage that other input transistors fail to turn on.

DCTL is close to the simplest possible digital logic family, using close to fewest possible components per logical element.

A similar logic family, direct-coupled transistor–transistor logic, is faster than ECL.

John T. Wallmark and Sanford M. Marcus described direct-coupled transistor logic using JFETs. It was termed direct-coupled unipolar transistor logic (DCUTL). They published a variety of complex logic functions implemented as integrated circuits using JFETs, including complementary memory circuits.

== DCTL in today's life ==
DCTL is a catalyst for other transistors which are very convenient to use. They were made 65 years ago and have many updated and different variations of them today. One of the more recent and used today is called transistor–transistor logic (TTL) and resistor–transistor logic (RTL). TTL functions similarly to DCTL, except DCTL has lower signal levels and is sensitive to ground noise, while TTL depends more on polarity. DCTLs are not used as much as they were in the past. RTL also focuses heavily on polarity, specifically being a bipolar transistor switch. They are still very important and changed the history of audio and are the fundamental stepping stones to creating higher-quality inventions.

== Logical functions ==
A DCTL circuit has three logical functions: AND gating, OR gating, and signal inversion (NOT gating). Each of these functions is the building block of what creates the circuit board. An AND gate requires two or more inputs that are true for there to be an outcome. As an example, let's say that 1 and 2 are true and 0 is false the only way for there to be an output is for the input to contain either 1,2, or both. If any of the inputs are 0, there will be no output. All inputs must be true for there to be an output. OR gating also requires two or more inputs, but unlike AND gating, only one of the inputs is required to be true. The NOT gate only needs a single input, so there could be an output. Therefore, if the single input is not true, there will be no output. With these three gates, many other logical functions can be made with them making the possibilities endless.

== Other functions ==
A DCLT is known for doing three functions:

- Inverters
- Series gating
- Parallel gating

Each of these functions makes the output voltage supply low, so it does not have a negative impact on the other circuits in the machine.Each of these functions lowers the output voltage supply to prevent any negative impact on the other circuits in the machine.,

Inverters are also known as NOT gates which can be connected by collector resistors. For the next DCTL to turn on, there must be enough V_{CE(SAT)} (saturation voltage) going through the previous circuit. If the V_{CE(SAT )} is too low, the next gate will not open up. If you want only a certain amount of circuits open, then the V_{CE(SAT)} needs to be smaller than the next transistor V_{BE(ON)} (voltage input) between the base and emitter. It depends on your desired function.

Series gating is a little different. If even one of the transistors is off, then the output voltage would end up being the supply voltage (V_{CC}) at D. For the next stage to determine the voltage of D, that would entirely depend on the V_{BE(ON)} (input voltage) of the next transistor. If all the transistors are on, then D would be closer to the ground, which can cause some complications. The next transistor has to be completely off for there to be no complication with the device.

Parallel gating is three transistors with individual inputs rather than a single input compared to the other functions. If the V_{BE(ON)} is high, the voltage will go through a load resistor causing the voltage output to be low.

== Disadvantages of using DCTL ==
- Current hogging
- Noise problem

One of the main disadvantages of using a DCTL is called current hogging. Current hogging is when two or more circuits are operating in parallel. The downside of this is that one of the circuits tends to do all the work and take up all the voltage (V_{BE}) resulting in it overheating and then possibly breaking down. Since no two transmitters have the same voltage, this tends to happen. Due to this happening, inventors and engineers look for transistors with a small voltage output, which is something that a DCTL is known for, but the phenomenon can still happen.

The noise problem is related to the voltage noise. The reason that the phenomenon is such a great problem is due to circuits being incredibly sensitive to noise, since they operate at a fast speed and low voltage. Also with several transistors, the polarities pulse can cause unwanted transistors to turn on. Picked-up noises by connecting leads can also lead to more problems leading the device to not work.

== Advantages of using DCTL ==
- Simple circuit
- Does not require much power to work
- Does not take up too much space
- Help limit voltage output

With these advantages, many incredible inventions have been created. Since it does not take up too much space and does not use too much power, this makes them very convenient to use. They can also limit the voltage output that other transistors may create and therefore lead to there being less issues with machines.
