= Servel =

American manufacturer of gas and electric appliances

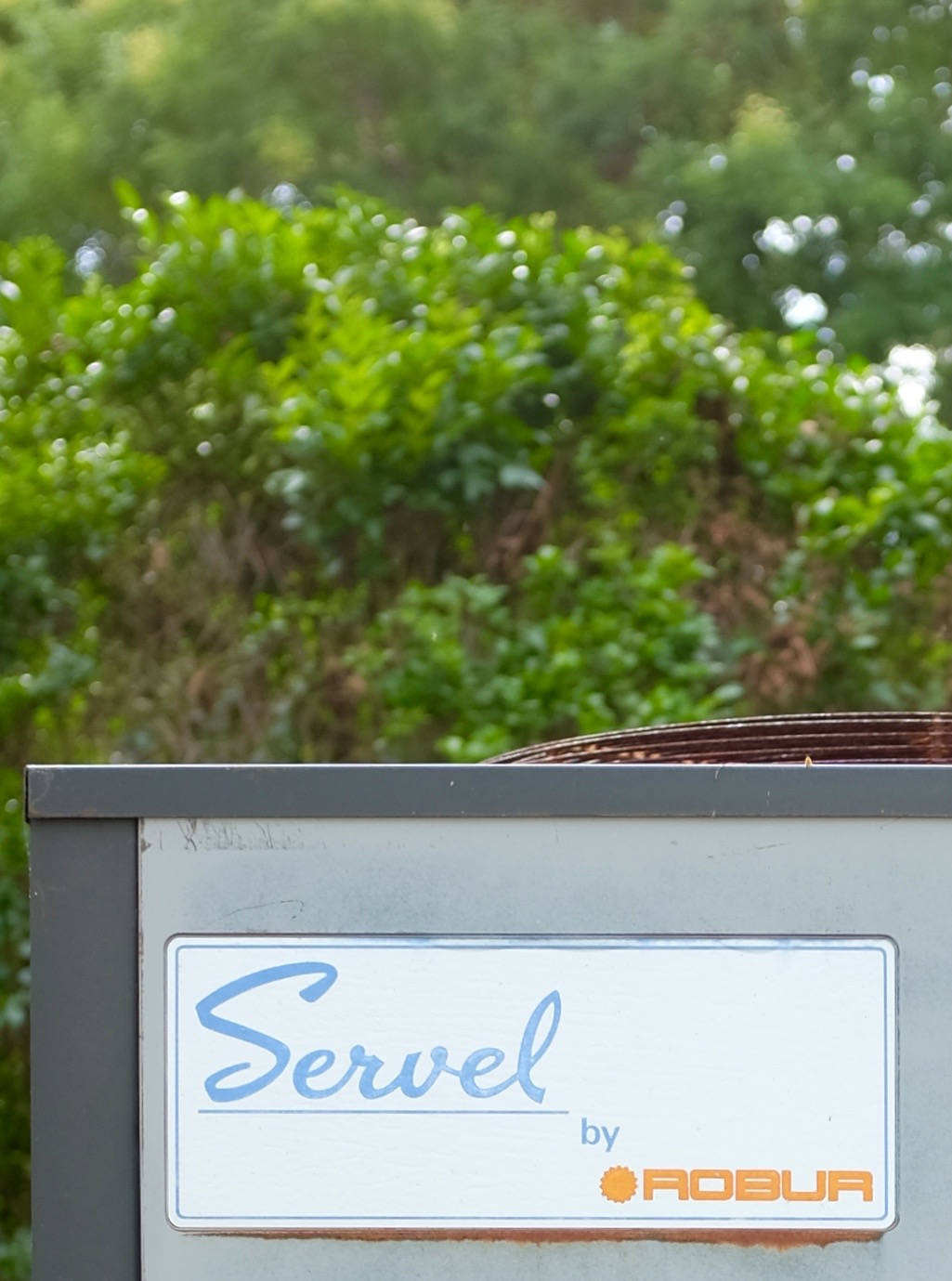
A Servel Robur air conditioner compressor unit on Governor's Island, New York City.

Servel was an American manufacturer of heating and cooling appliances, founded in 1922.

Founded by Colonel William McCurdy to produce refrigerators and named National Electric Products Company, the company adapted and shortened the name "Servel" from their slogan, "Serving Electricity." In 1925, the company bought American rights to a Swedish patent for a continuous absorption refrigerator and started to focus on the gas refrigeration market. The new model was available to consumers in 1926, and Servel quickly came to dominate the gas refrigerator market, its competition having all but disappeared within a few years. From 1927 until 1956, when it ceased producing them, it was the only American manufacturer of gas refrigerators.

In 1939, Servel (then Electrolux-Servel) exhibited its residential gas air conditioner at the New York World's Fair. The exhibit, called "Magic Caves of Ice", was staged in the "Court of Flame", a building dedicated to promoting the gas industry.

As the United States entered World War II, Servel shifted its manufacturing to support the war effort. In addition to cooking units and munitions, Servel built wings for the Republic P-47 Thunderbolt. By the end of the war, they had produced over 6,000 pairs of wings for the US Air Force fighters.

Starting in 1949, National Electric started receiving classified research and development contracts for the government, resulting in the production of rockets and guided missiles, JATO, and sustainer motor bodies for U.S. missiles and rockets, particularly the Nike family of guided missiles.

In 1991, the company's remaining brands and manufacturing facilities were sold to Robur Group, an Italian manufacturer.
