= Engineers of Sweden =

Trade union in Sweden

- Sveriges Ingenjörer

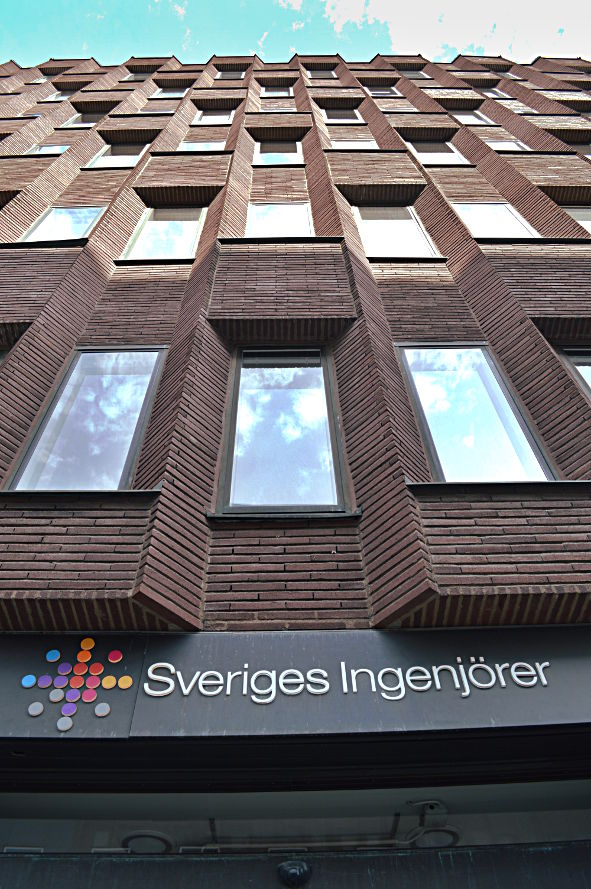
- Headquarters building
- Formation: January 1, 2007; 19 years ago
- Merger of: Sveriges Civilingenjörsförbund; Ingenjörsförbundet
- Headquarters: Oxtorgsgatan 9-11, 111 57 Stockholm, Sweden
- Field: Engineering
- Chair: Ulrika Lindstrand
- Parent organization: Saco

Engineers of Sweden (Swedish: Sveriges ingenjörer) is a trade union and professional association in Sweden, having 180,000 members.

It was created in 2007 by the merger of Sveriges Civilingenjörsförbund, which also used the name Swedish Association of Graduate Engineers in English, with the smaller Ingenjörsförbundet; in 2022 the union changed its English name to the less formal-sounding name Engineers of Sweden.
