= Arco (lamp) =

1960s Italian floor lamp

Arco Floor Lamp
- Designer: Pier Giacomo Castiglioni and Achille Castiglioni
- Date: 1962
- Materials: spun aluminum, stainless steel, marble
- Height: 241.5 cm (95.1 in)

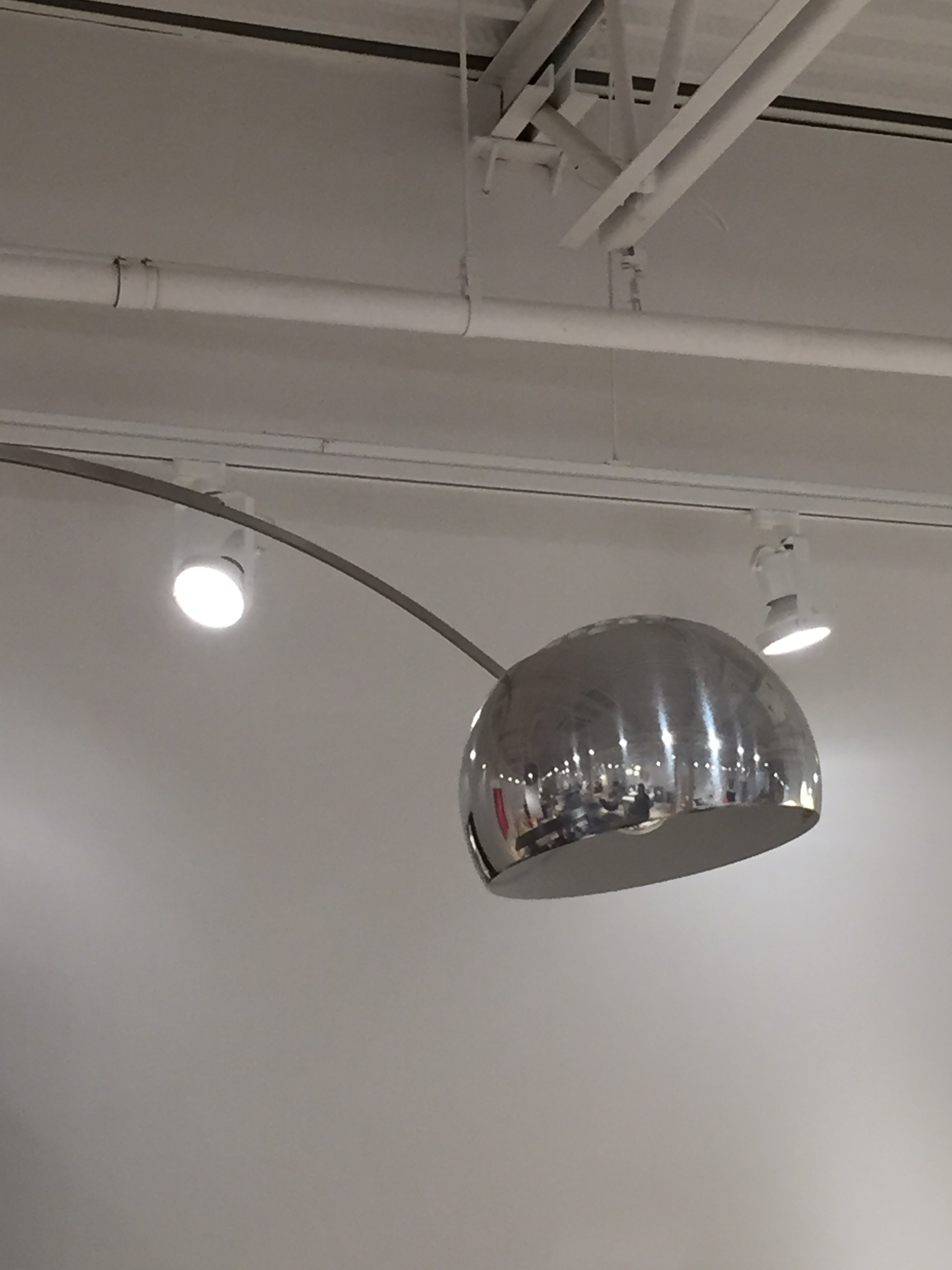
Closeup of pendant

The Arco lamp is a modern floor lamp designed by brothers Pier Giacomo and Achille Castiglioni for Flos in 1962. The lamp is characterized by a suspended spun aluminum pendant attached to an upright block of Carrara marble via a cantilevered arching arm made of stainless steel.

The lamp has been in constant production since its original release in 1962.

== History ==
In November 2006, Flos brought charges against Semeraro Casa & Famiglia SpA, claiming that the company had violated copyright law in selling a similar lamp named "Fluida." Advocate General Yves Bot deemed that while the Fluida lamp was created in imitation of the original Arco design, production of the product was legal, as the original design had since entered the public domain. Following the 2001 implementation of the Directive on the legal protection of designs, Bot ordered Semeraro to cease production of the Fluida lamp.

In 2020, the Arco lamp was one of three designs to be awarded the "Products Career Award", a newly created category of Compasso d'Oro for historical designs that have proven to be highly successful over time but were not awarded at the time of their inception.

== See also ==
- List of works in the Museum of Modern Art
