= Society for Fine Arts and Permanent Exhibition =

Italian moral entity organization

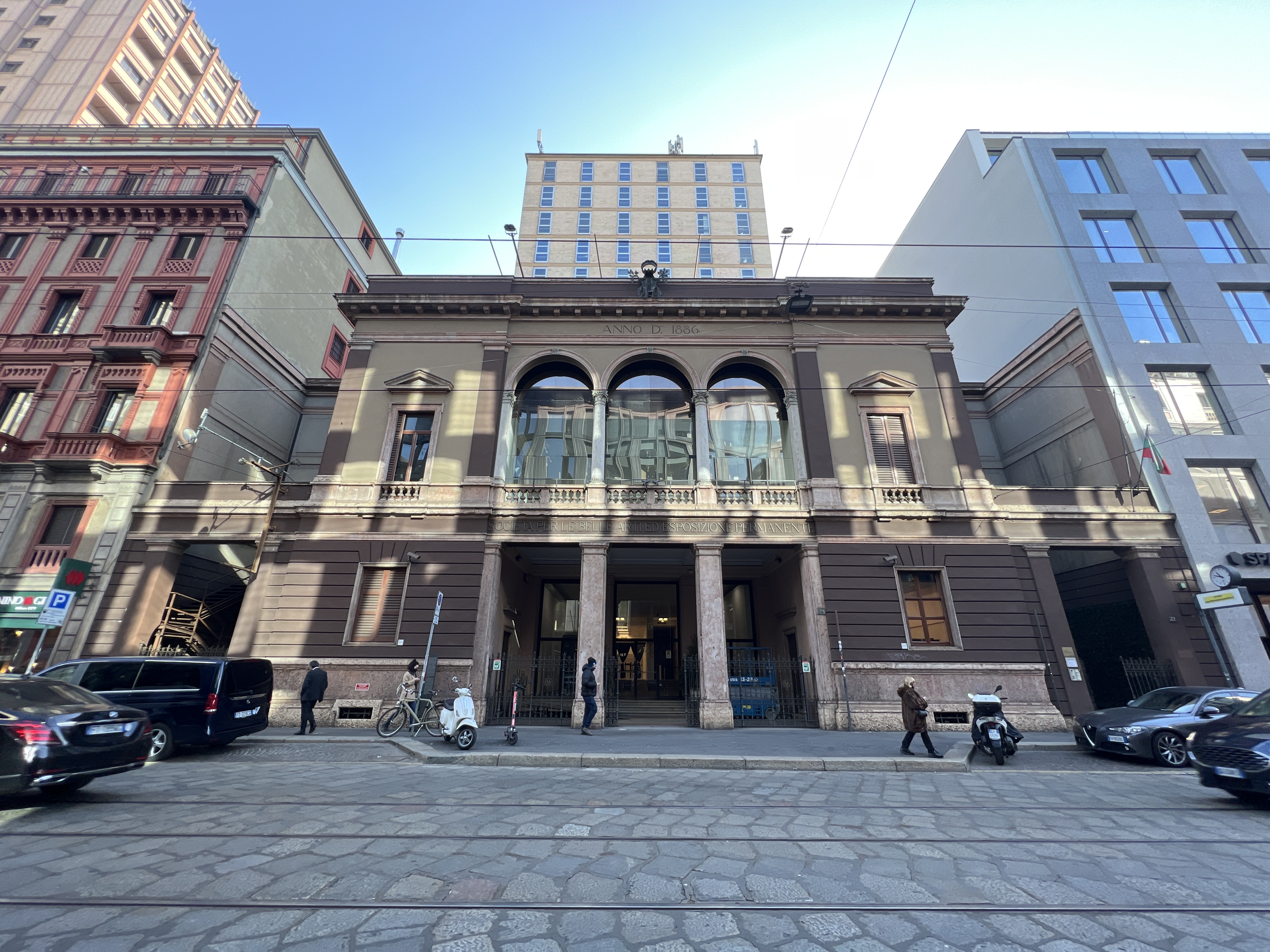
Facade.

Society for Fine Arts and Permanent Exhibition (Italian - Società per le Belle Arti ed Esposizione Permanente) is a moral entity and an artistic and cultural association in Milan, better known as La Permanente.

Its members have included Francesco Hayez, Antonio Rotta, Tranquillo Cremona, Daniele Ranzoni, Gaetano Previati, Emilio Longoni, Mosè Bianchi, Giuseppe Pellizza da Volpedo, Angelo Morbelli, Gerolamo Induno, Lorenzo Vela, Filippo Tommaso Marinetti, Umberto Boccioni, Barbara Pietrasanta, Mario Sironi, Leone Lodi, Achille Funi, Carlo Carrà, Francesco Messina, Attilio Rossi, Filiberto Sbardella, Trento Longaretti and Giuseppe Ajmone.

== History ==
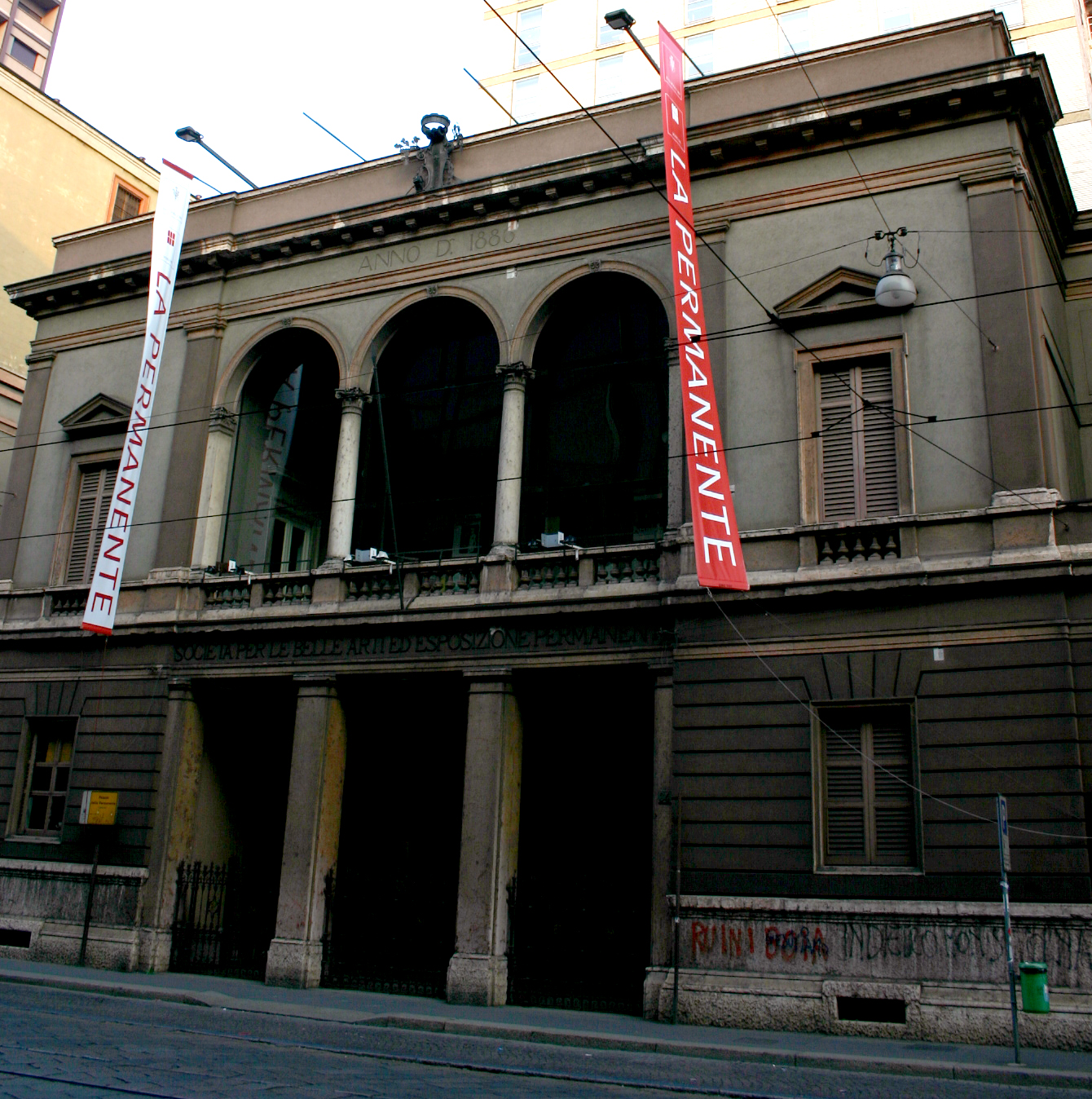
Palazzo della Permanente.

Its origins lie in the merger of the Society of Fine Arts (founded in Milan in 1844) and the Permanent Exhibition of Fine Arts (formed in Milan in 1870) and the resulting entity's foundation into a moral entity in 1883. Its cultural, non-profit character, dedicated to the promotion of the fine arts, was established by Umberto I the following year. Designed by Luca Beltrami to host art exhibitions, the society's headquarters is on via Turati (via Principe Umberto at the time it was built). It was inaugurated with an exhibition on 25 April 1886, followed by the first exhibition of members' work in 1892. Since the 19th century it has independently carried out its mission of spreading culture in Milan and its orbit as well as nationally and internationally. It organises thematic exhibitions and exhibitions of its members' works.

It held its inaugural exhibition in 1886, followed by one in 1900 dedicated to Lombard painting in the 19th century. Its palazzo was badly damaged by bombing in 1943 and at the end of the Second World War it was rebuilt to designs by Pier Giacomo and Achille Castiglioni in 1952–1953. It then hosted a 1953 exhibition on women in art marked that postwar reconstruction, whilst one on Milan itself in 1957 clarified its relationship with the city. It has also hosted the Brera Biennial, begun in 1908, which was revived after the Second World War as the Milan National Biennial.

Over the time the society's museum was formed. Its collection consists of the purchase prizes of the Milan City Biennial, raffled works and donations from private individuals and members. Its archive is extremely important, despite the severe damage caused by Second World War bombings. It also publishes widely, particularly catalogues of its exhibitions.

== Presidents ==
- 1886–1891 Federico Mylius
- 1892–1907 Carlo Bassi
- 1907–1935 Giorgio Mylius
- 1935–1945 Giovanni Treccani degli Alfieri
- 1945–1952 Carlo Ernesto Accetti
- 1952–1952 Giuseppe Caprotti
- 1952–1953 Giovanni Falck
- 1953–1957 Paolo Stramezzi
- 1957–1958 Giovanni Falck
- 1958–1961 Paolo Stramezzi
- 1961–1964 Franco Marinotti
- 1964–1972 Eugenio Radice Fossati
- 1972–1976 Angiola Maria Barbizzoli Migliavacca Campari
- 1976–1984 Alfredo Spagnolo
- 1984–2000 Giampiero Cantoni
- 2000–2003 Alberto Ghinzani
- 2003–2006 Rosellina Archinto
- 2006–2007 Giuseppe Melzi
- 2007–2013 Guido Podestà
- 2013–2016 Giulio Gallera
- 2016 Emanuele Fiano

== Main exhibitions ==
- 1886 Inaugural exhibition
- 1892 First members' exhibition
- 1900 19th century Lombard painting
- 1912 Tranquillo Cremona (posthumous)
- 1915 Italian prints
- 1916 Brera Biennial
- 1926 Novecento Italiano
- 1929 Novecento Italiano
- 1953 Women in art from Hayez to Modigliani
- 1953 XVIII Milan national biennial
- 1955 XIX Milan national biennial
- 1957 XX Milan national biennial
- 1957 Milan yesterday and today through art
- 1959 50 years of art in Milan. From Divisionism to today
- 1966 The Scapigliatura: painting, sculpture, literature, music, architecture
- 1979 Medardo Rosso
- 1983 Novecento italiano
- 1984 Oskar Kokoschka, 1906/1924, drawings and watercolours
- 1990 Sculpture in Milan, 1945–1990
- 2001 Extraordinary exhibition of the members of La Permanente
- 2003 In material: from Futurism to Kiefer, from Burri to Kounellis
- 2004 Salone 2004
- 2006 Ventipiucento, celebrating La Permanente's 120th anniversary
- 2006 Arturo Martini
- 2007 Il Carnevale, on Gianfilippo Usellini
- 2013 Dürer. Prints from the Novara collection
- 2018 Chagall. A Midsummer Night's Dream
- 2018 Urbanart colore/materia/luce
- 2018 Caravaggio. Beyond the Canvas
- 2018 Tex Willer. 70 Years of a Myth
- 2019 Io and Leonardo, artists of La Permanente and the inheritance of Leonardo
- 2025 Jack Vettriano, organised by Deborah Petroni, Chiara Campagnoli and Rubens Fogacci
