= Pier Giacomo Castiglioni =

Italian architect and designer (1913–1968)

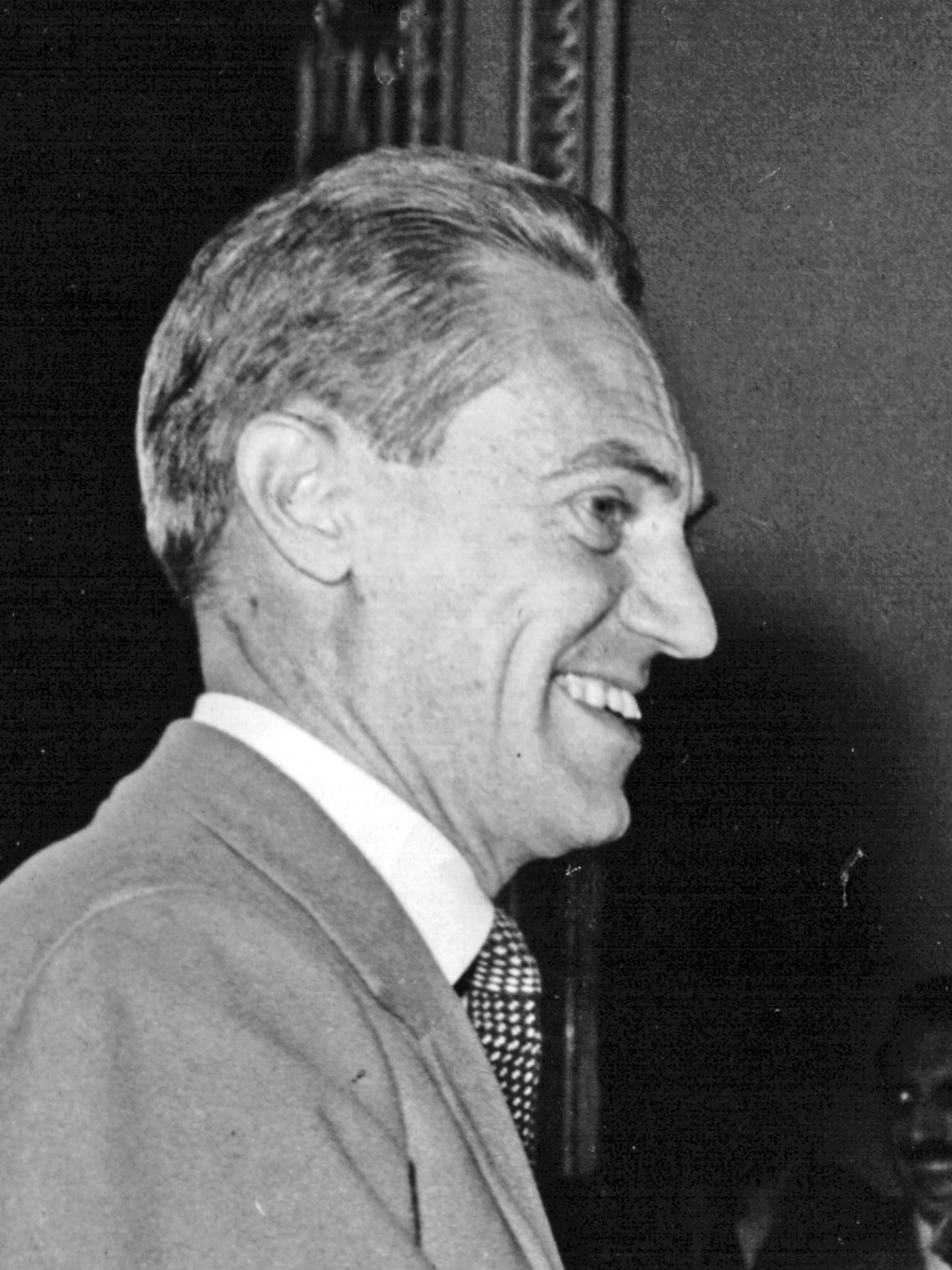
- Born: 22 April 1913; Milan, Italy
- Died: 27 November 1968 (aged 55); Milan
- Education: Politecnico di Milano
- Known for: Architecture, design
- Spouse: Maria Coduri de Cartosio
- Father: Giannino Castiglioni
- Family: Achille Castiglioni, Livio Castiglioni (brothers)
- Awards: Compasso d'Oro
- Website: piergiacomocastiglioni.it

Pier Giacomo Castiglioni (22 April 1913 – 27 November 1968) was an Italian architect and designer.

== Early life and education ==
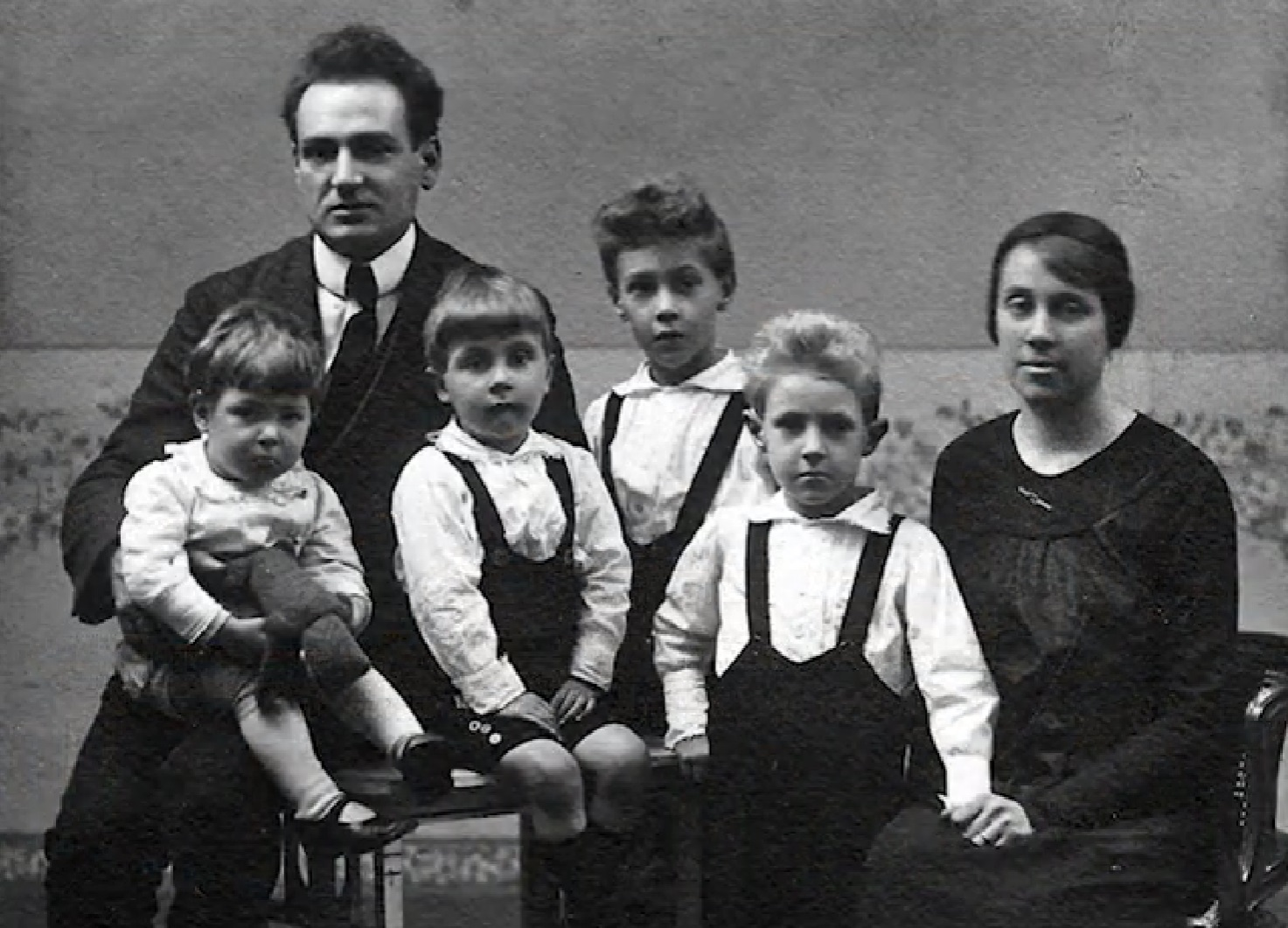
Castiglioni family portrait with brothers Achille, Livio, and Pier Giacomo (1922)

Pier Giacomo Castiglioni was born on 22 April 1913 in Milan, in Lombardy in northern Italy. He was the second son of Livia Bolla and the sculptor Giannino Castiglioni.

Castiglioni studied architecture at the Politecnico di Milano and graduated in 1937. His elder brother Livio and younger brother Achille were also architects.

He married Maria Coduri de Cartosio on 30 December 1942.

== Work and career ==
In 1937 or 1938 he started an architectural design practice with his brother Livio and Luigi Caccia Dominioni. Amongst the designs produced by the practice were the first Italian bakelite radio for Phonola. The studio closed in 1940.

After the Second World War, he and Livio joined by their younger brother Achille, who had also graduated in architecture in 1944. Much of their work was in product and exhibition design, but they also carried out a number of architectural projects, including the reconstruction in 1952–53 of the Palazzo della Permanente, which had been destroyed by bombing in 1943.

Livio Castiglioni left the practice in 1952 or 1953. From then until Pier Giacomo died, he and Achille worked as a team; most of their designs are not attributable to either one of them.

Products designed by the Castiglioni brothers in the post-war years included the "Turbino", "Luminator", "Toio", and "Arco" lamps for Flos, the "Spalter" vacuum cleaner, and a number of audio devices for Brionvega including the RR 126 radiogram. Working alone, Pier Giacomo designed the "Mezzadro" stool for Zanotta based Marcel Duchamp's concept of "ready made". However, it was not manufactured until 1971, three years after Castiglioni's death.

In 1956 he was one of the founding members of the Associazione per il Disegno Industriale (ADI) in Milan and also taught life drawing at the Politecnico di Milano from 1964 to 1968.

Castiglioni's work was awarded 5 Compasso d'Oro awards.

He died in Milan on 27 November 1968.

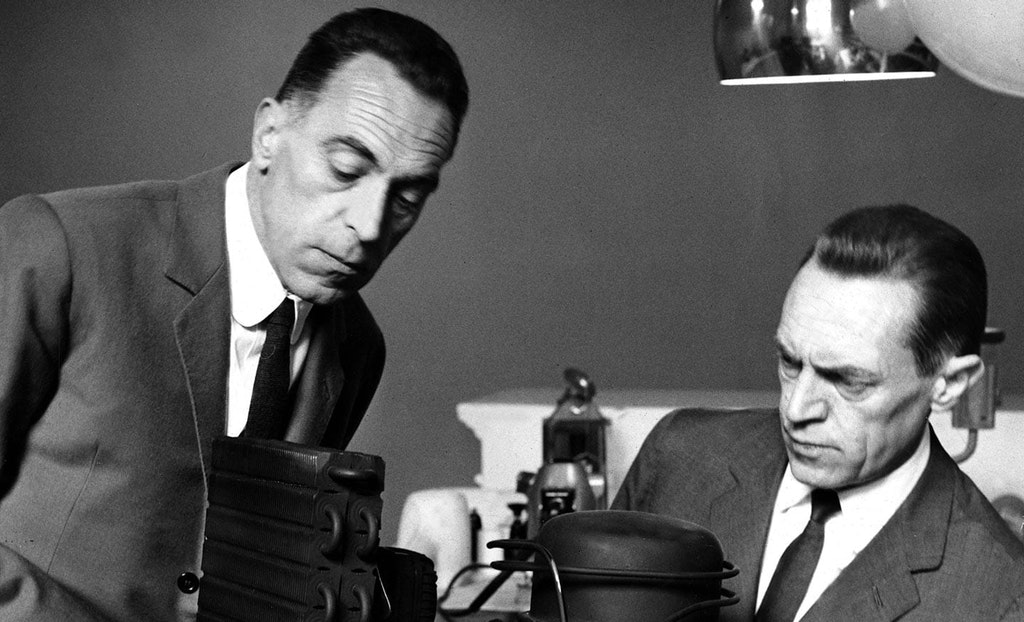
With brother Achille

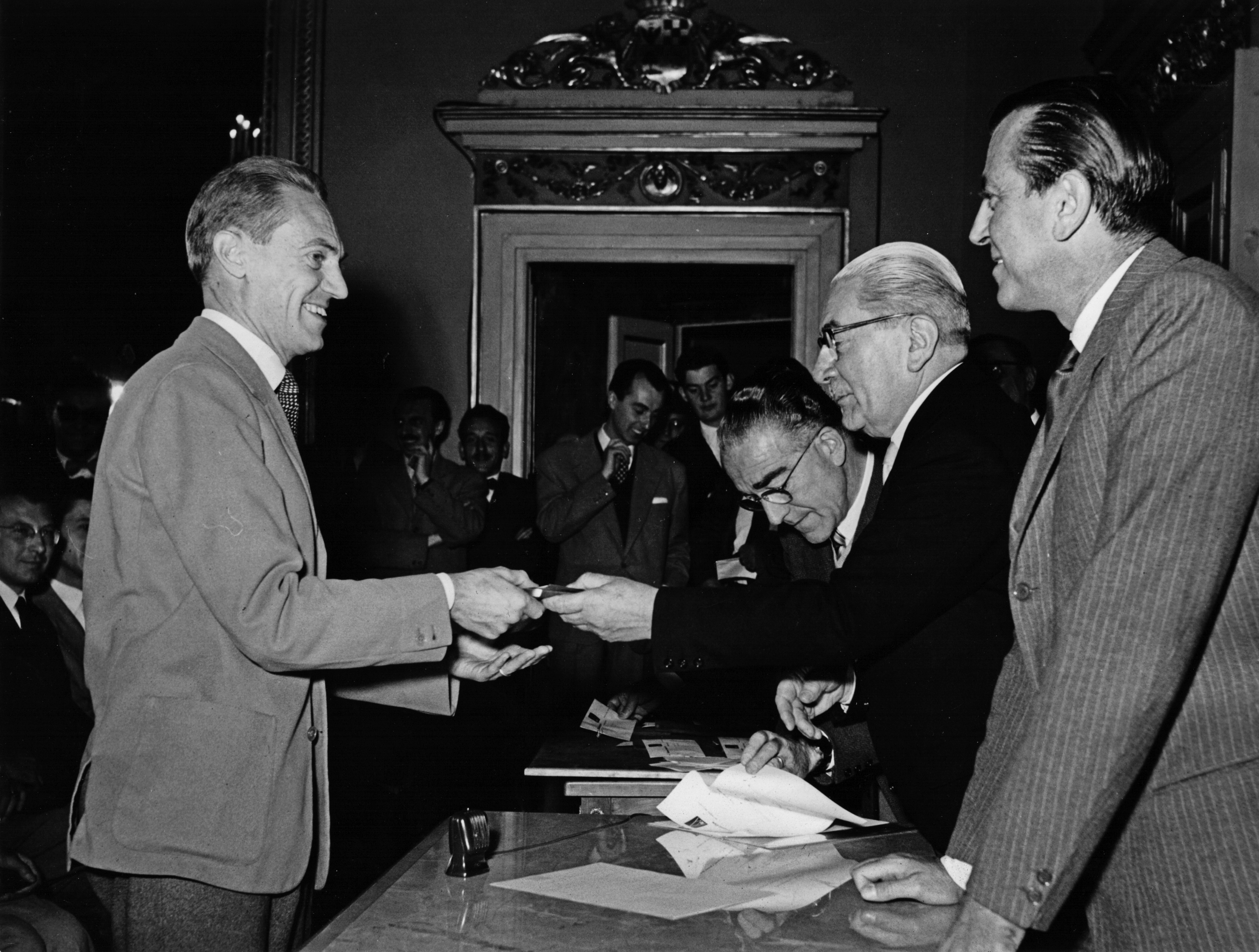
Pier Giacomo Castiglioni receiving the Compasso d'Oro award in 1955

== Legacy ==
Collections holding examples of his work include those of the Museum of Modern Art (MoMA) in New York, The Pompidou Centre in Paris, the Victoria and Albert Museum (V&A) in London, and the ADI Design Museum in Milan.

Reflecting on his friendship with the Castiglionis, the designer Massimo Vignelli said:

"In reality, the Castiglioni brothers were one person. Symbiosis of thought, creative ability, inspiration and execution were an integral part of their being. Talking to one of them or all three of them was the same, they were completely interchangeable, same voice, same accent, same grin, same laughter, same gestures. They were the Castiglioni, like their work, indivisible fruit of the same research, of the same passion, of a great ability to transform the world around us into a new memorable gesture."

In 2014 the city of Milan named a street after the three Castiglioni brothers (Via Fratelli Castiglioni).

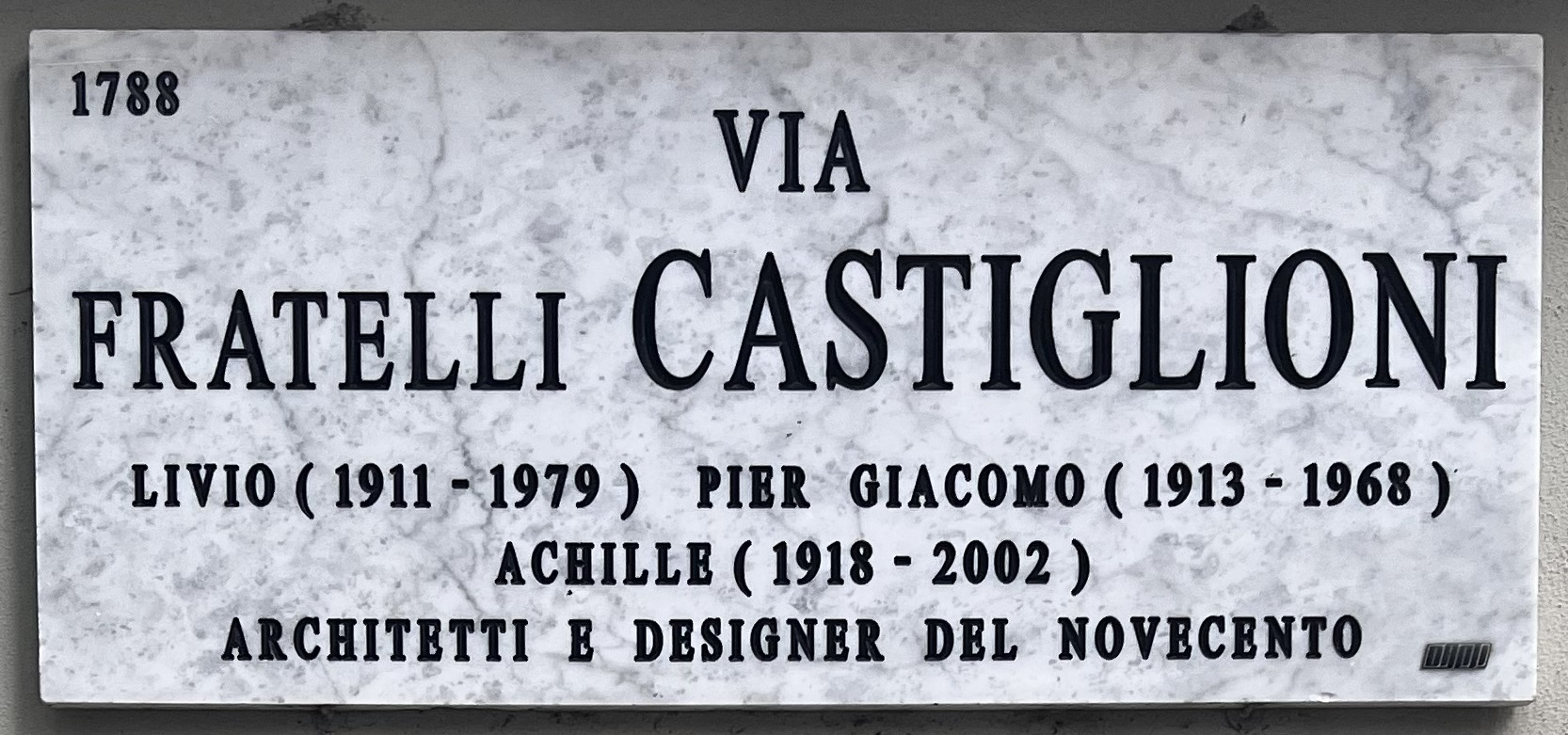

== Gallery of works ==
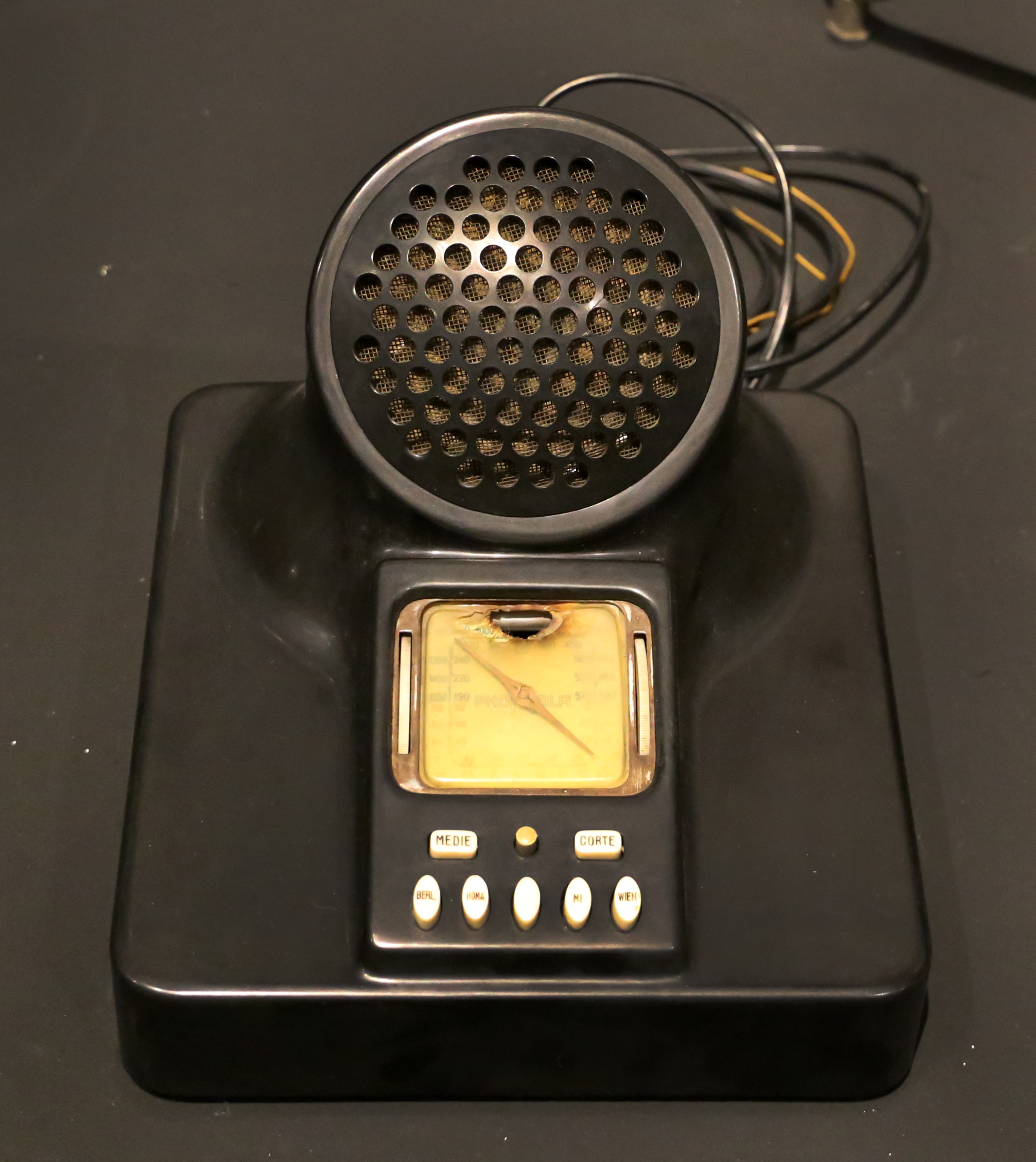
Tabletop radio designed for Phonola (1939)

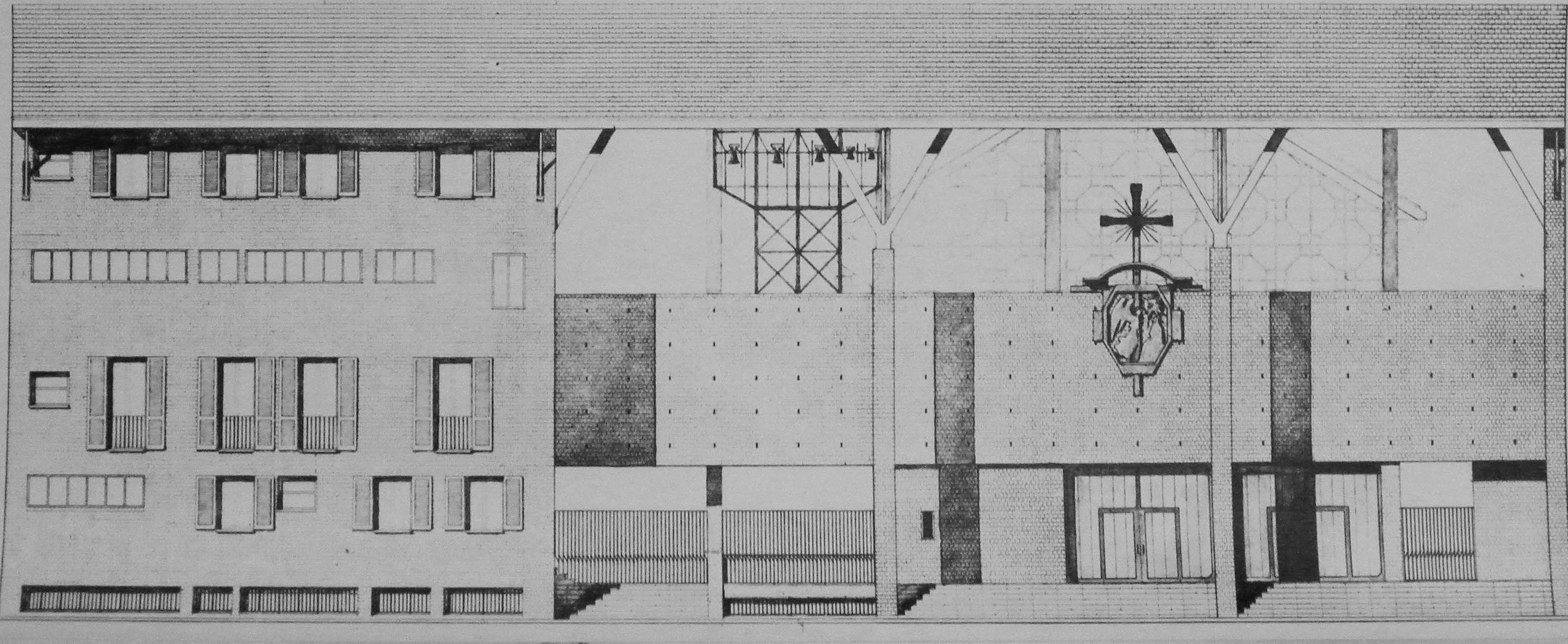
Architectural drawing of San Gabriele Arcangelo in Mater Dei (1956–1959)

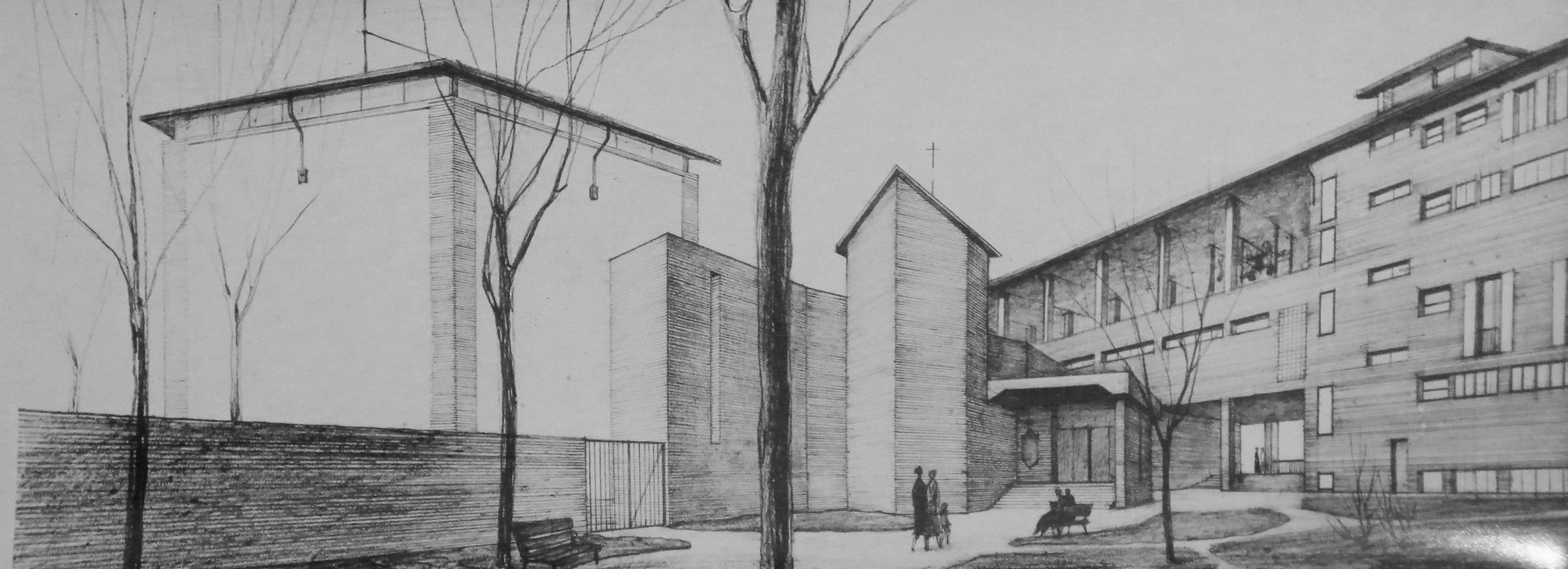
Perspective drawing of San Gabriele Arcangelo in Mater Dei

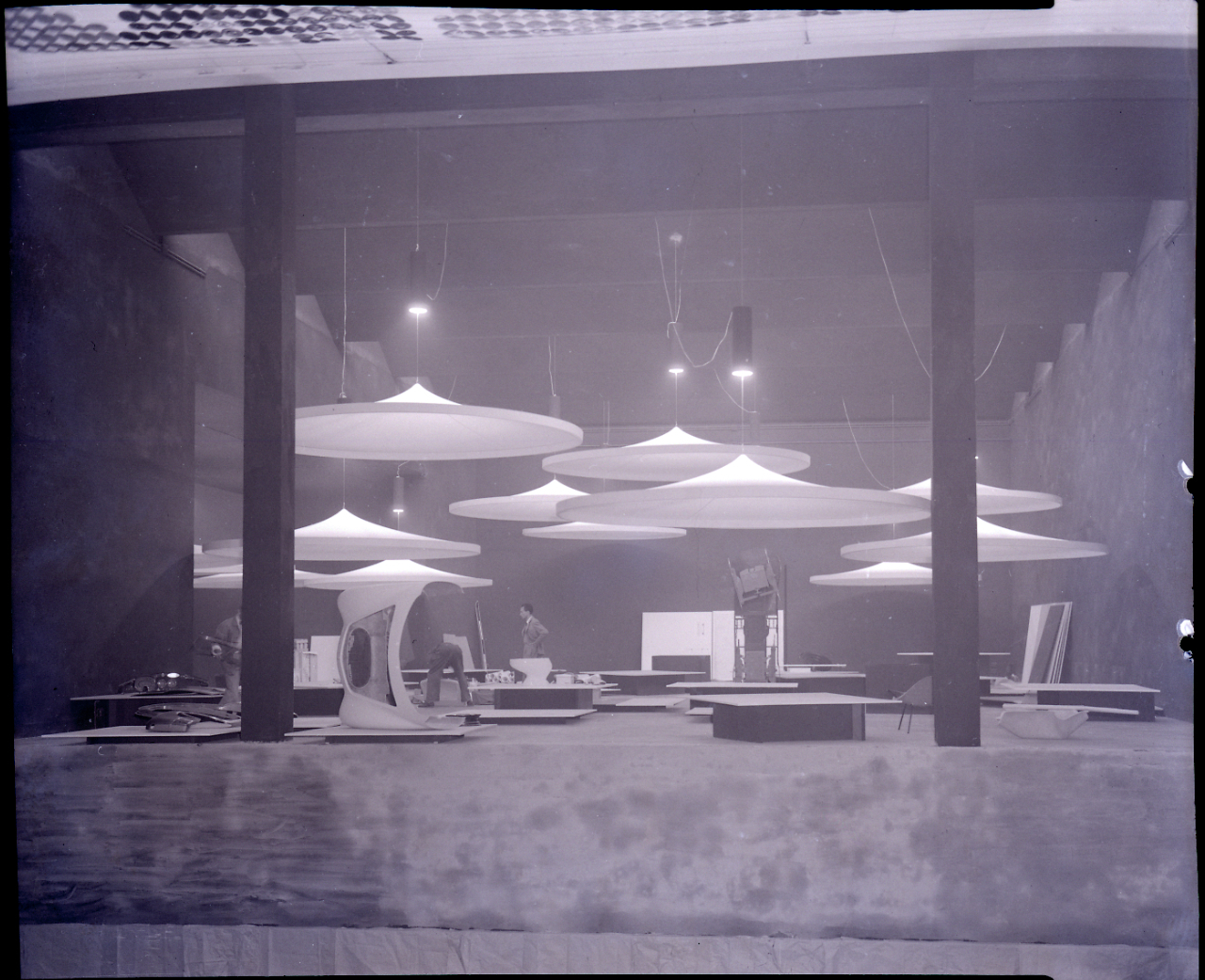
Milan Triennale X, Industrial Design exposition (1954)

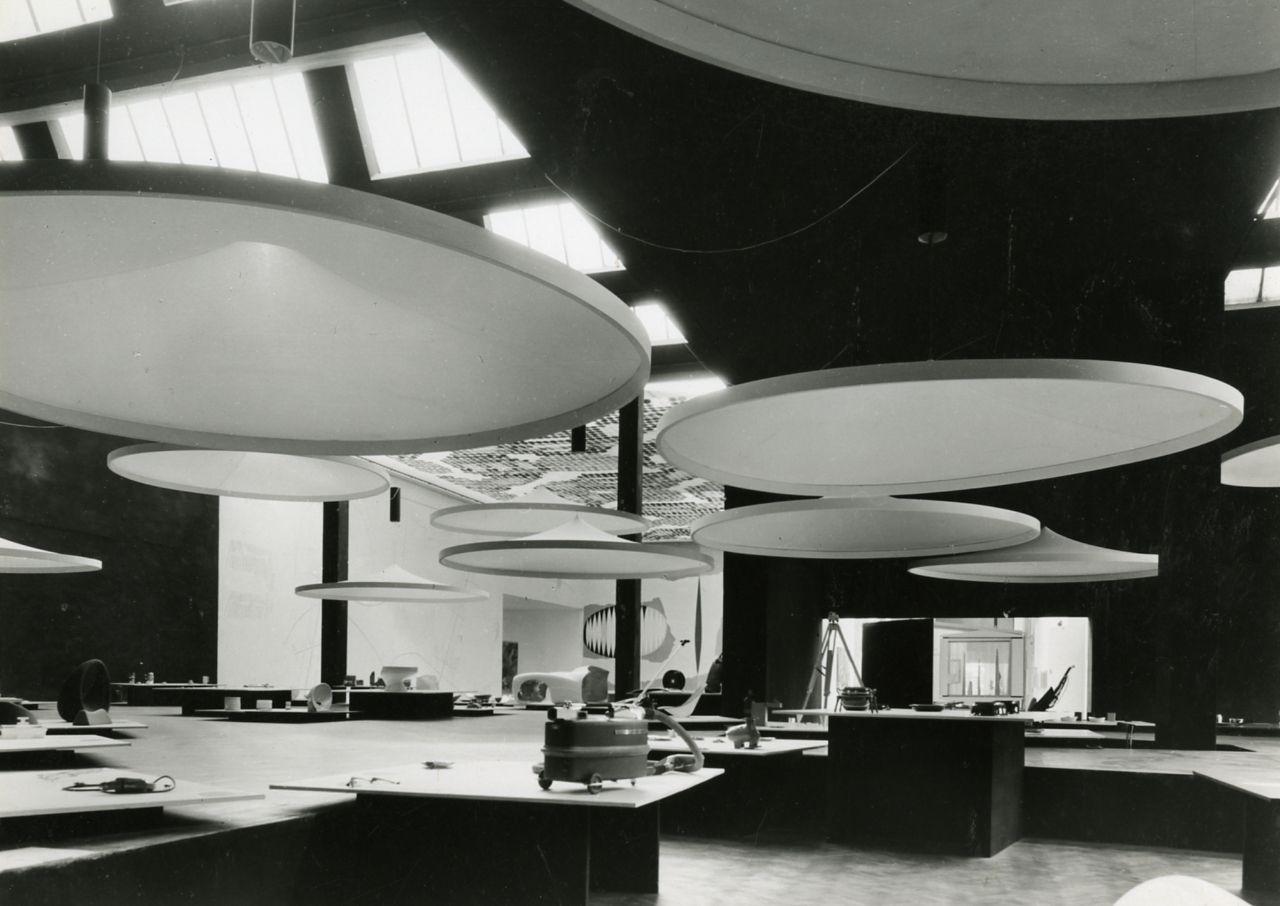
Another view of Milan Triennale X

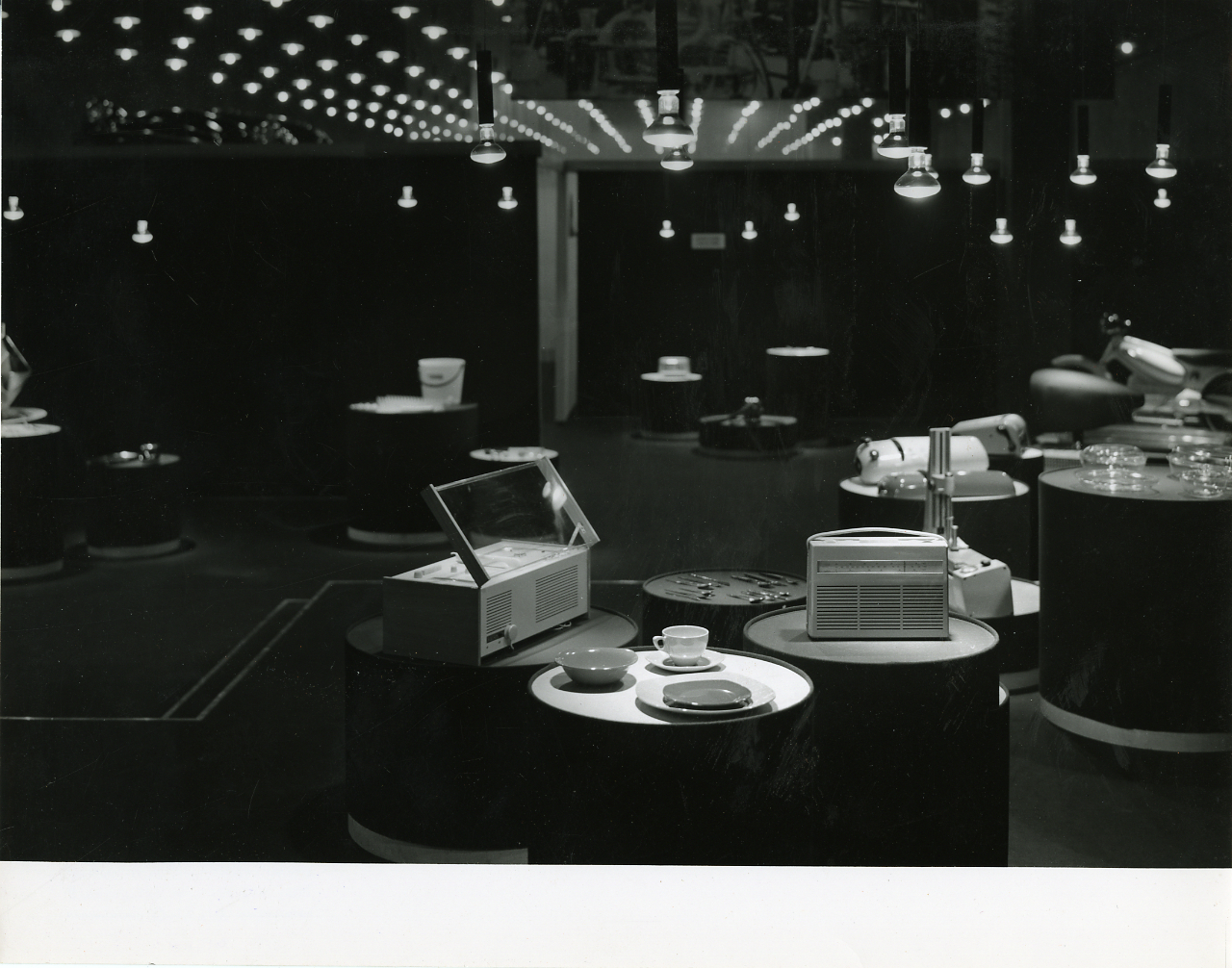
Another view of Milan Triennale X

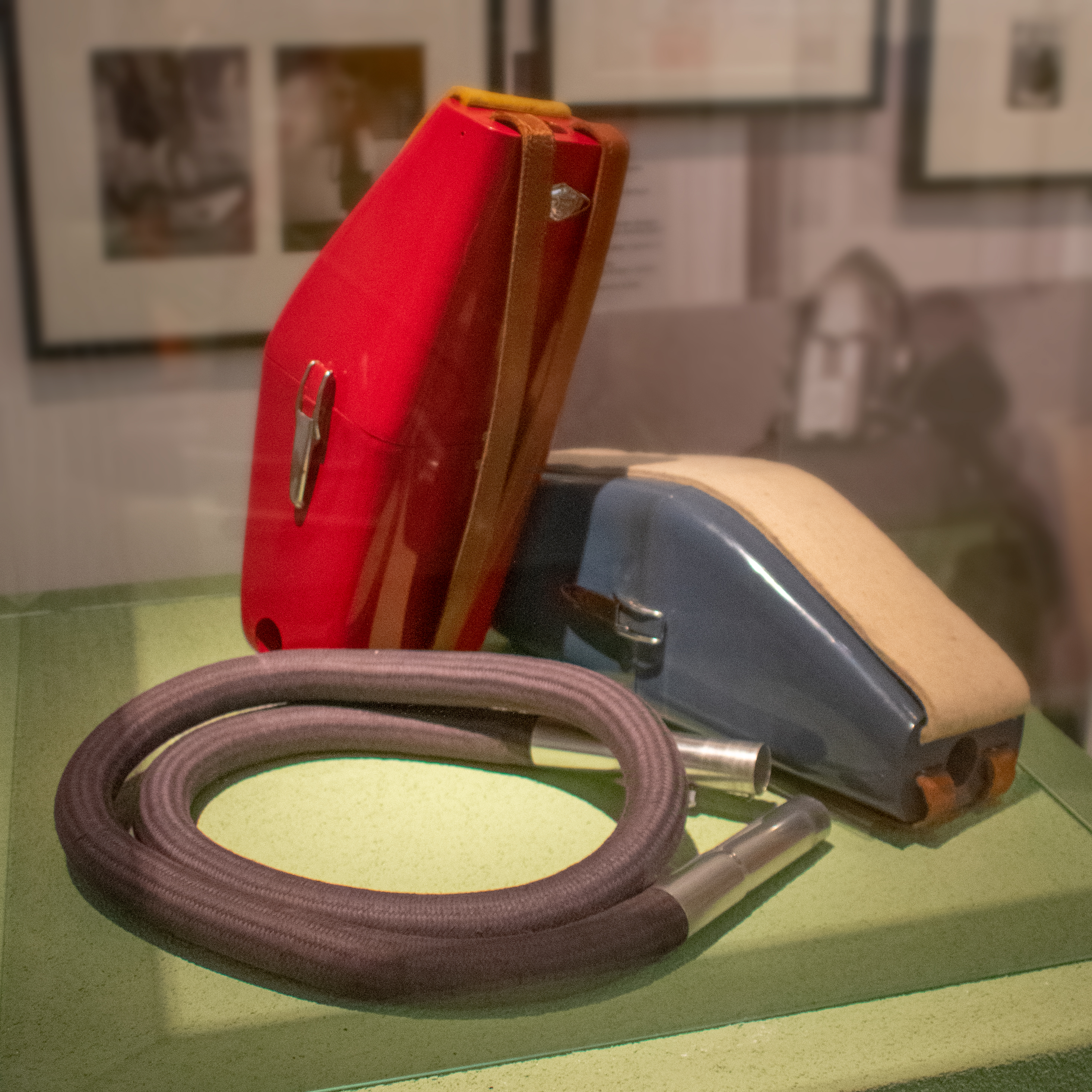
Spalter vacuum cleaner (1956)

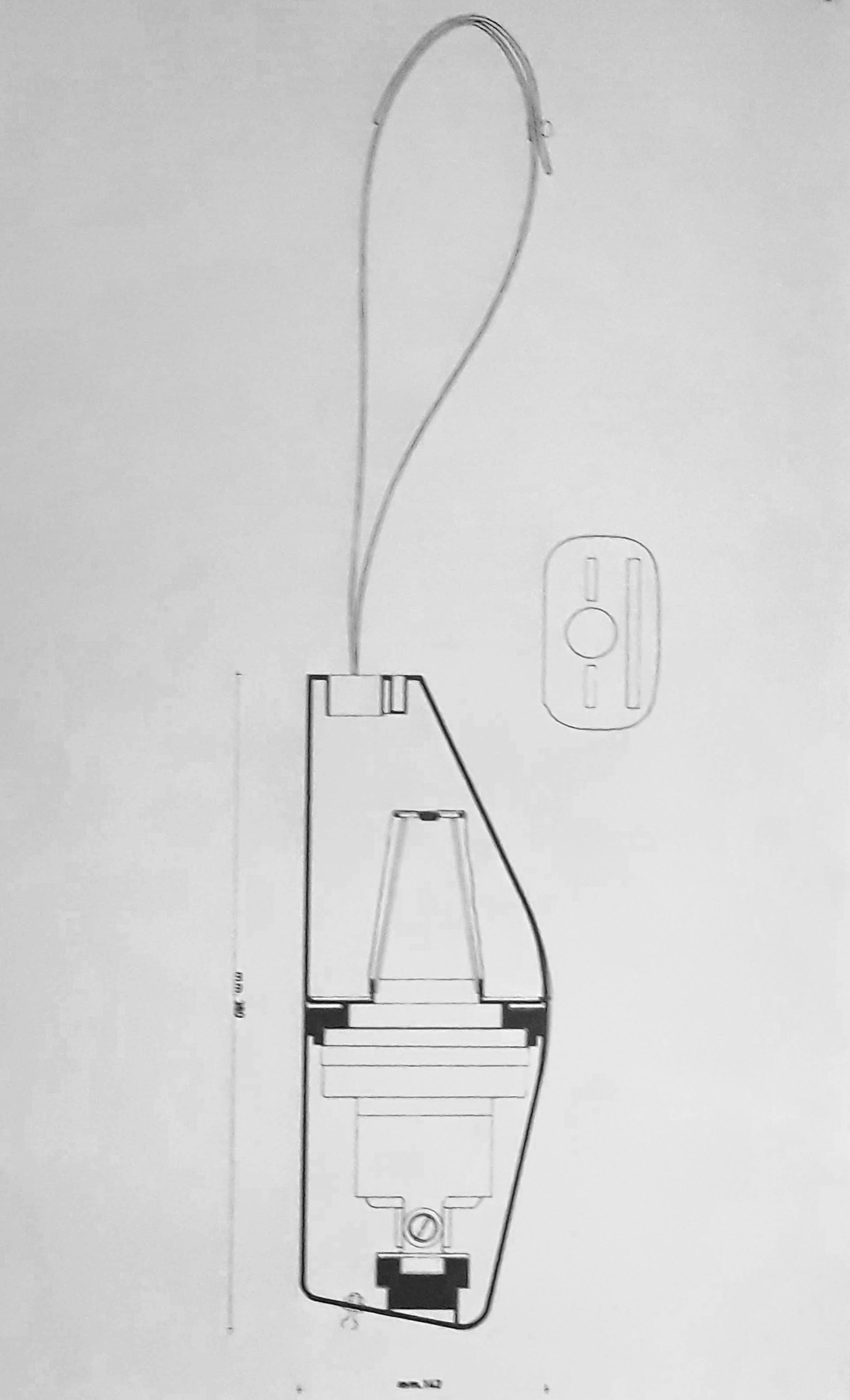
Spalter (technical drawing)

Sanluca armchair designed in 1959 for Gavina (drawing showing construction detail)

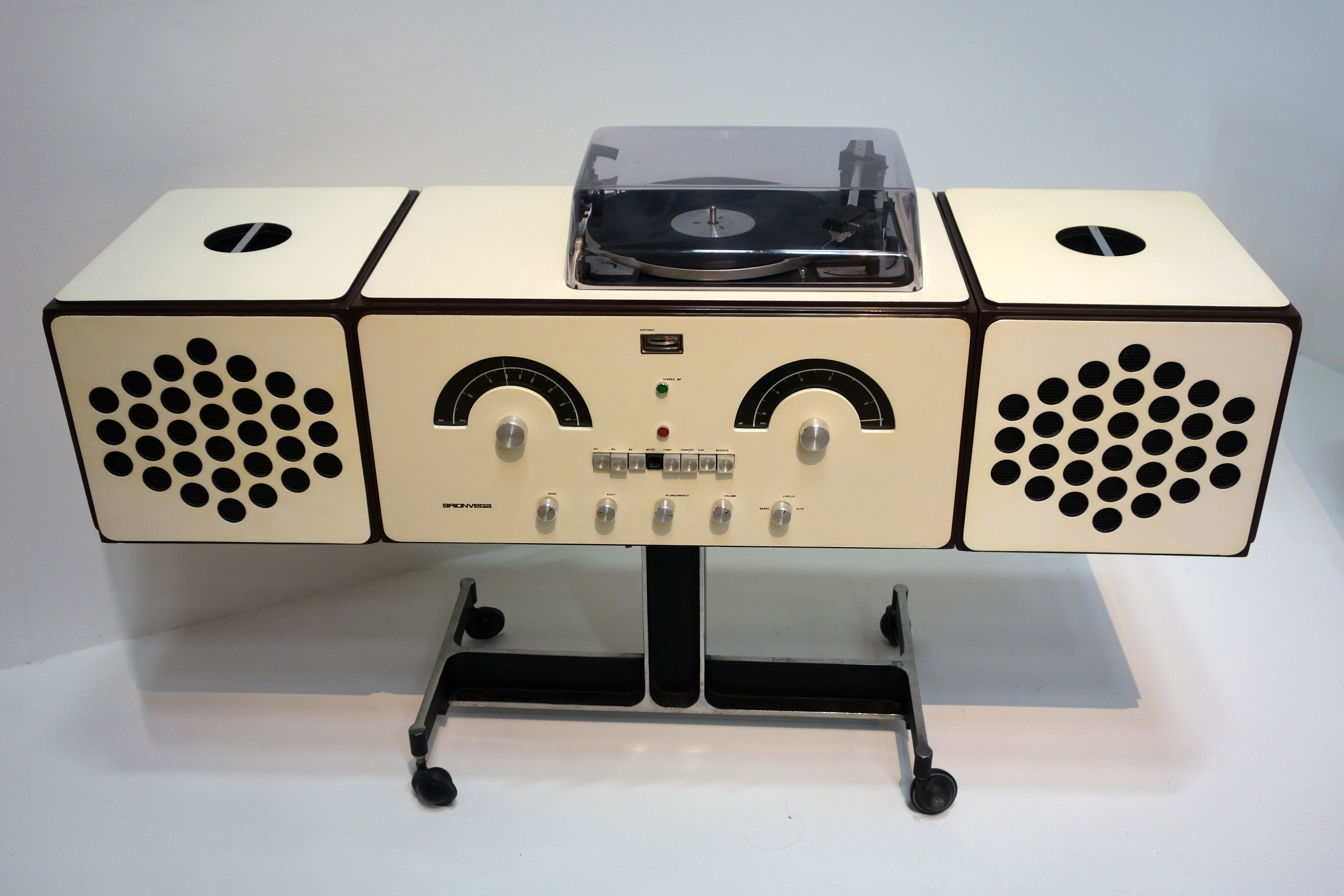
RR 126 radiogram designed for Brionvega

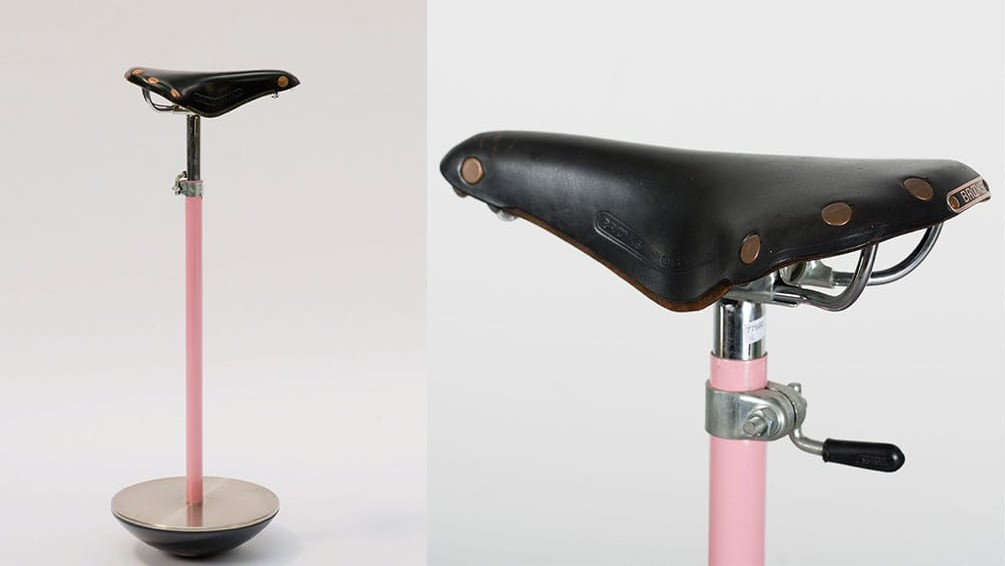
Sella stool designed for Zanotta

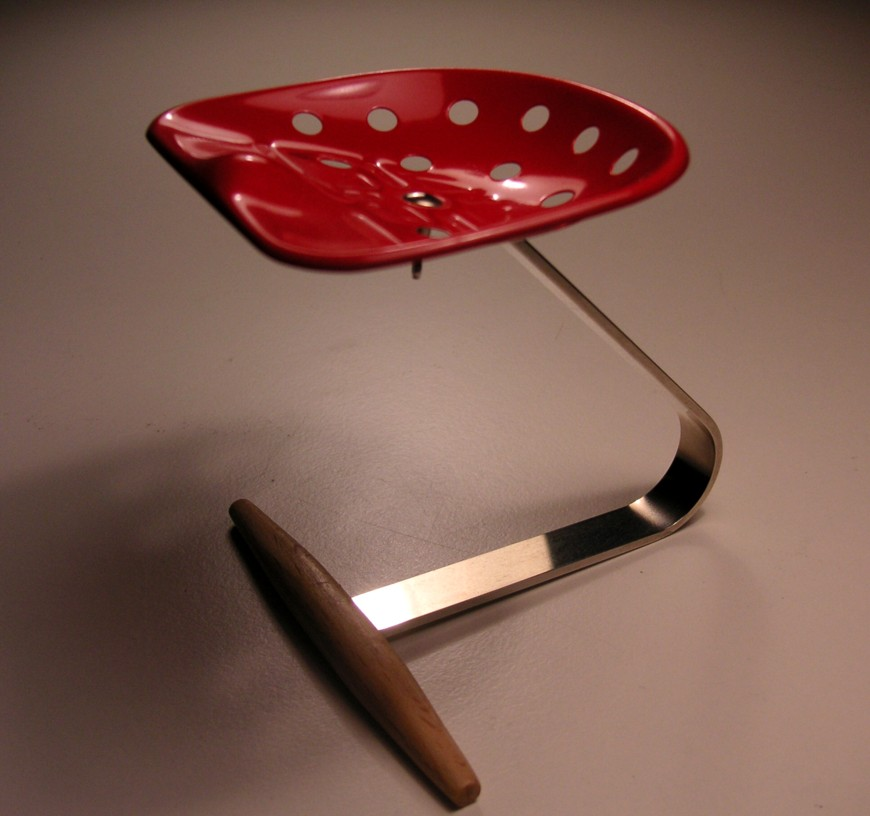
Mezzadro stool designed for Zanotta

Drawing of Arco lamp designed for Flos (1962)

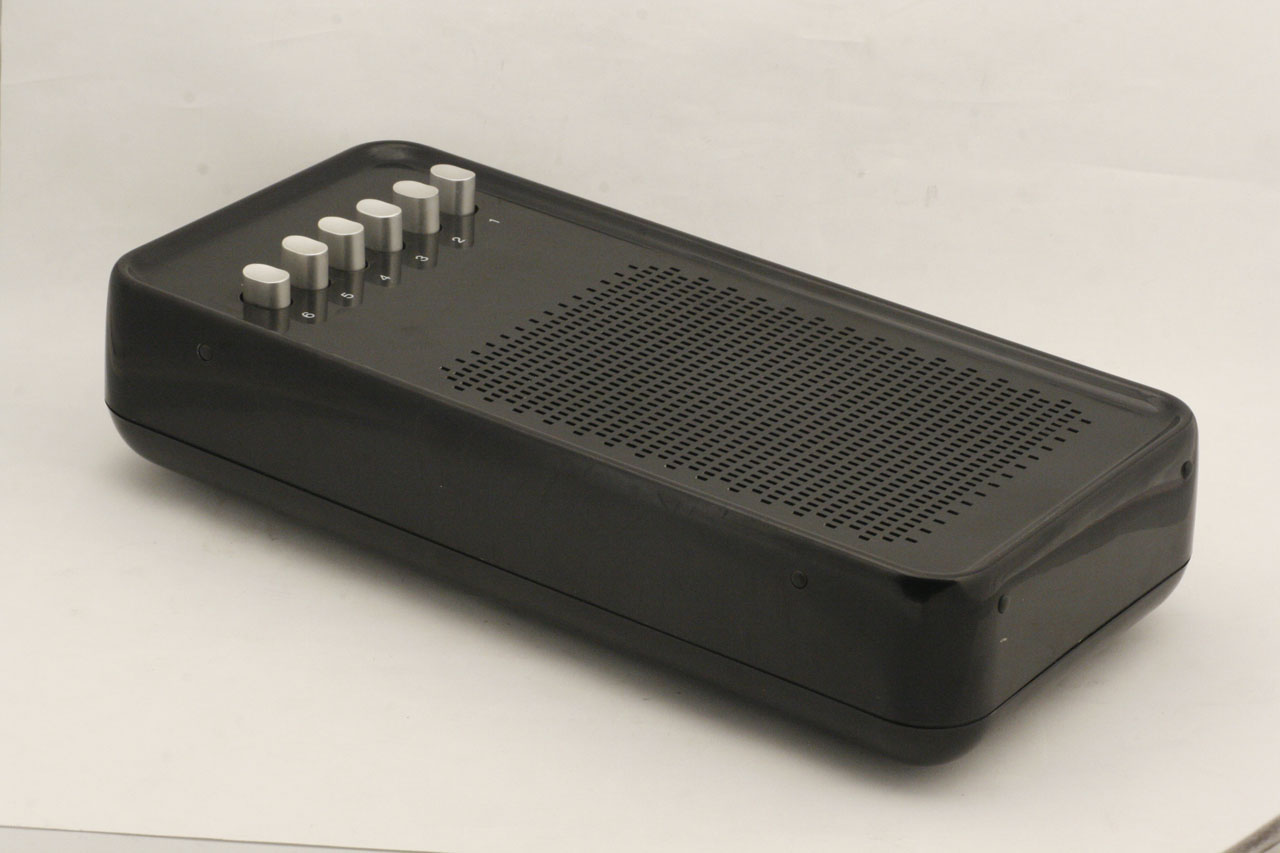
Analog Piped Radio receiver designed for Brionvega (1967–1970)
