= Achille Castiglioni =

Italian architect and designer (1918–2002)

- Born: 16 February 1918; Milan, Kingdom of Italy
- Died: 2 December 2002 (aged 84); Milan, Italy
- Education: Politecnico di Milano
- Known for: Architecture; Design
- Notable work: Arco floor lamp
- Father: Giannino Castiglioni
- Relatives: Livio Castiglioni; Pier Giacomo Castiglioni
- Awards: Compasso d'Oro; RDI

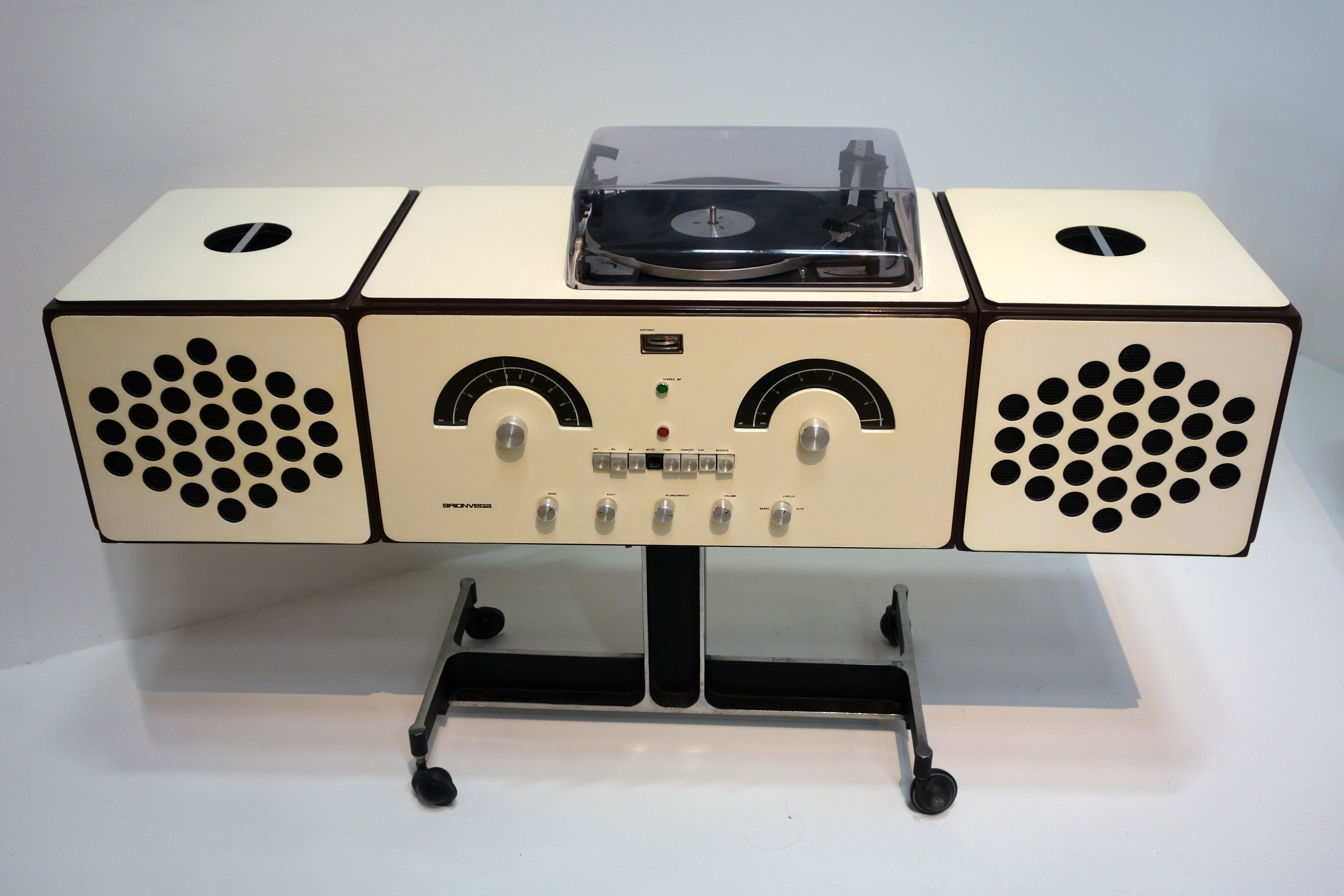
RR 126 radiogram designed for Brionvega (1964)

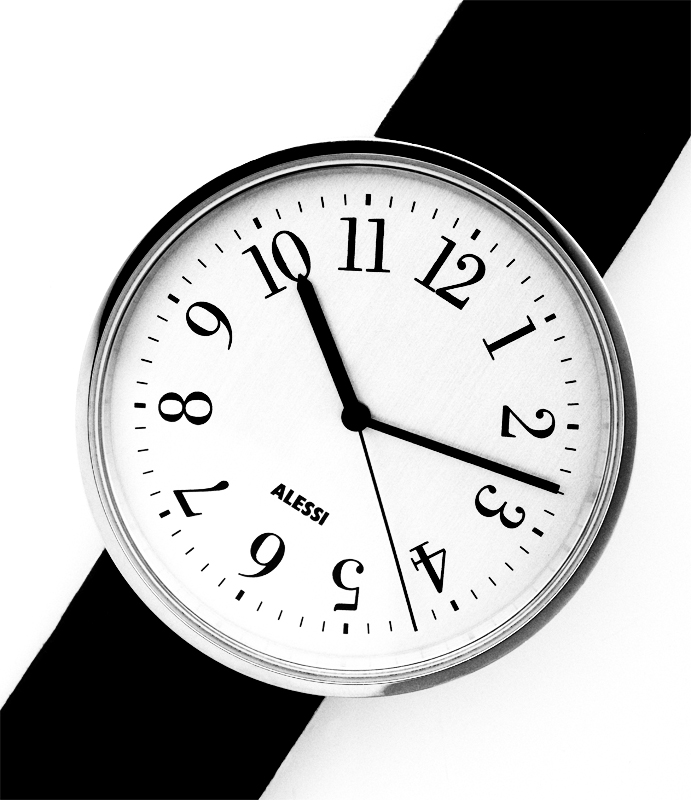
Record wristwatch designed for Alessi

Achille Castiglioni (Italian pronunciation: [aˈkille kastiʎˈʎoːni]; 1918 – 2002) was an Italian architect and designer. He is known for his furniture, lighting, radiograms and other objects, many of which are considered icons of post-war Italian design. As a professor of design, he advised his students "If you are not curious, forget it. If you are not interested in others, what they do and how they act, then being a designer is not the right job for you." (Note: Se non siete curiosi, lasciate perdere. Se non vi interessano gli altri, ciò che fanno e come agiscono, allora quello del designer non è un mestiere per voi.)

== Early life and education ==
Castiglioni was born on 16 February 1918 in Milan, in Lombardy in northern Italy. He was the third son of the sculptor Giannino Castiglioni and his wife Livia Bolla.

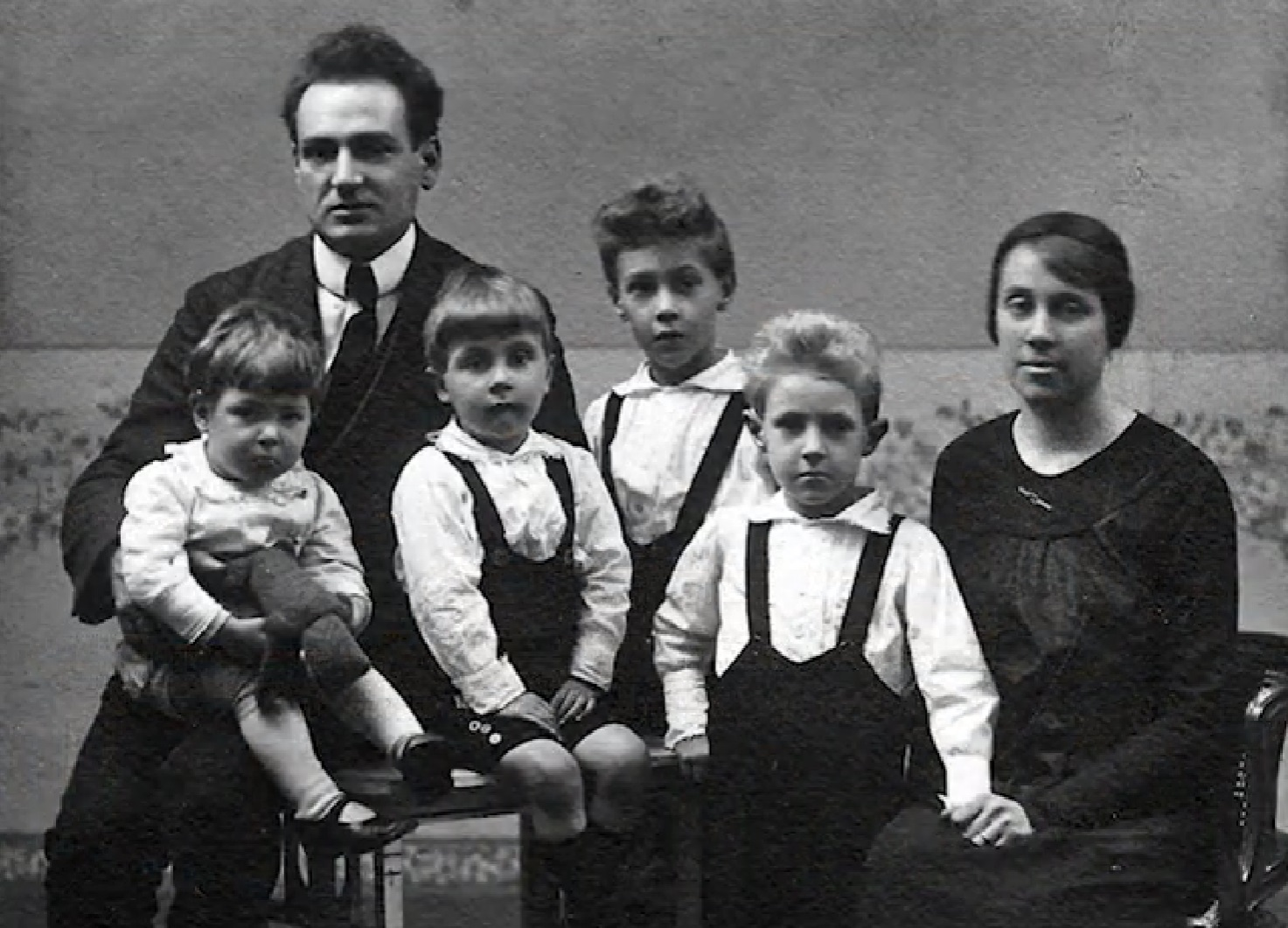
Castiglioni family portrait with Achille (sitting), Livio, and Pier Giacomo (1922)

Castiglioni studied classics at the Liceo Classico Giuseppe Parini in Milan, and then changed schools to study the arts at the Liceo artistico di Brera. In 1937 he enrolled in the faculty of architecture of the Polytechnic University of Milan. When the Second World War broke out, he became an officer in the artillery and was stationed on the Greek front and later in Sicily. He returned to Milan before the Allied invasion of Sicily of 1943. In March 1944 he graduated from the Polytechnic University of Milan.

His elder brothers Livio and Pier Giacomo were also both architects.

== Work and career ==
Following the war, Castiglioni returned to Milan and joined the architectural design practice that his brothers Livio and Pier Giacomo had started with Luigi Caccia Dominioni in 1938. Much of their work was in exhibition design, but they also carried out a number of architectural projects, including the reconstruction in 1952–53 of the Palazzo della Permanente, which had been destroyed by bombing in 1943.

Livio Castiglioni left the practice in 1952. From then until Pier Giacomo died in 1968, he and Achille worked as a team; their designs are not attributable to either one of them. After the death of Pier Giacomo, Castiglioni worked alone.

Together, the brothers created a number of works that explored Marcel Duchamp's concept of the ready-made by incorporating and repurposing existing objects into new designs such as the "Toio" floor lamp for Flos (1962), which utilises a surplus transformer, electrical components, and an automobile headlamp, as well as the "Sella" and "Mezzadro" stools for Zanotta (both in 1957), using a bicycle saddle and a stamped metal tractor seat respectively.

During the same period the brothers experimented with new furniture typologies and concepts such the "Cubo" couch for Arflex. In 1959, they began working with Kartell, designing lighting and furniture, including a collection of tables and stools called "Rochetto". The Castiglioni brothers designed the "Lierna" chair for Cassina, and the "Taraxacum" chandelier for Flos in 1960. Also for Flos, in 1962 they designed the "Arco" lamp, which consists of a long, arched, cantilevered stainless-steel support, an adjustable shade made of perforated spun aluminium, and a heavy rectangular marble base. These projects were followed in 1964 by the "Splüghen Braü" pendant light, and the RR 126 radiogram for Brionvega.

From 1969 he taught architectural and design subjects, first at the Politecnico di Torino, and then, from 1980 when he became an ordinario or full professor, at the Politecnico di Milano.

Achille Castiglioni died in Milan on 2 December 2002.

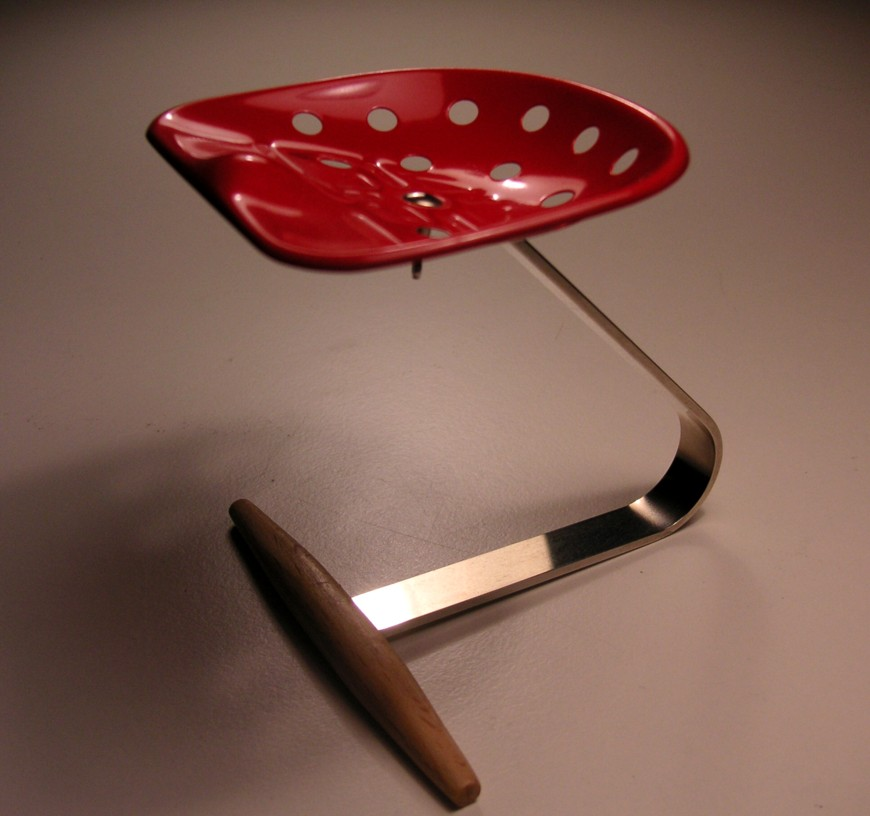
Mezzadro chair designed for Zanotta (1957)

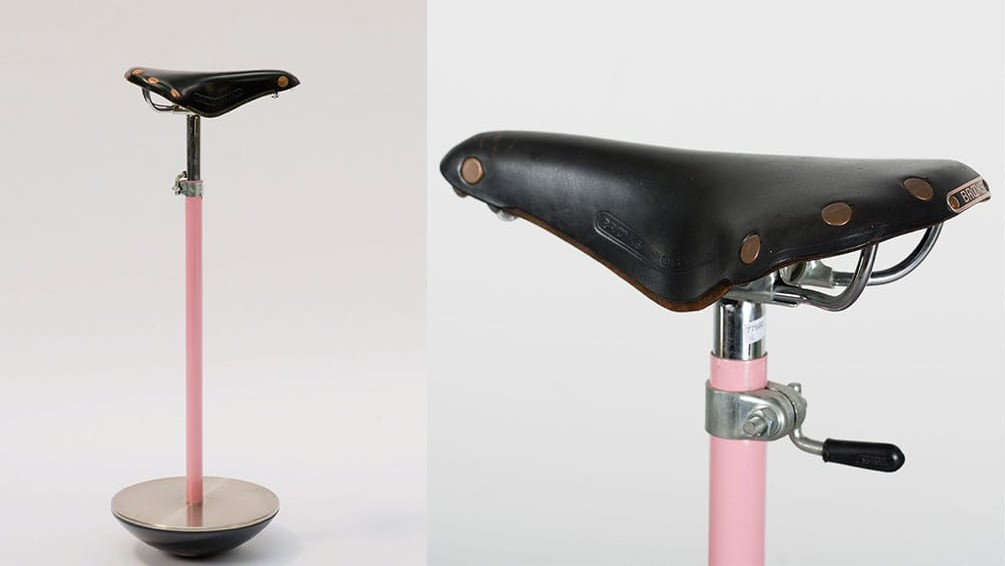
Sella stool designed for Zanotta (1957)

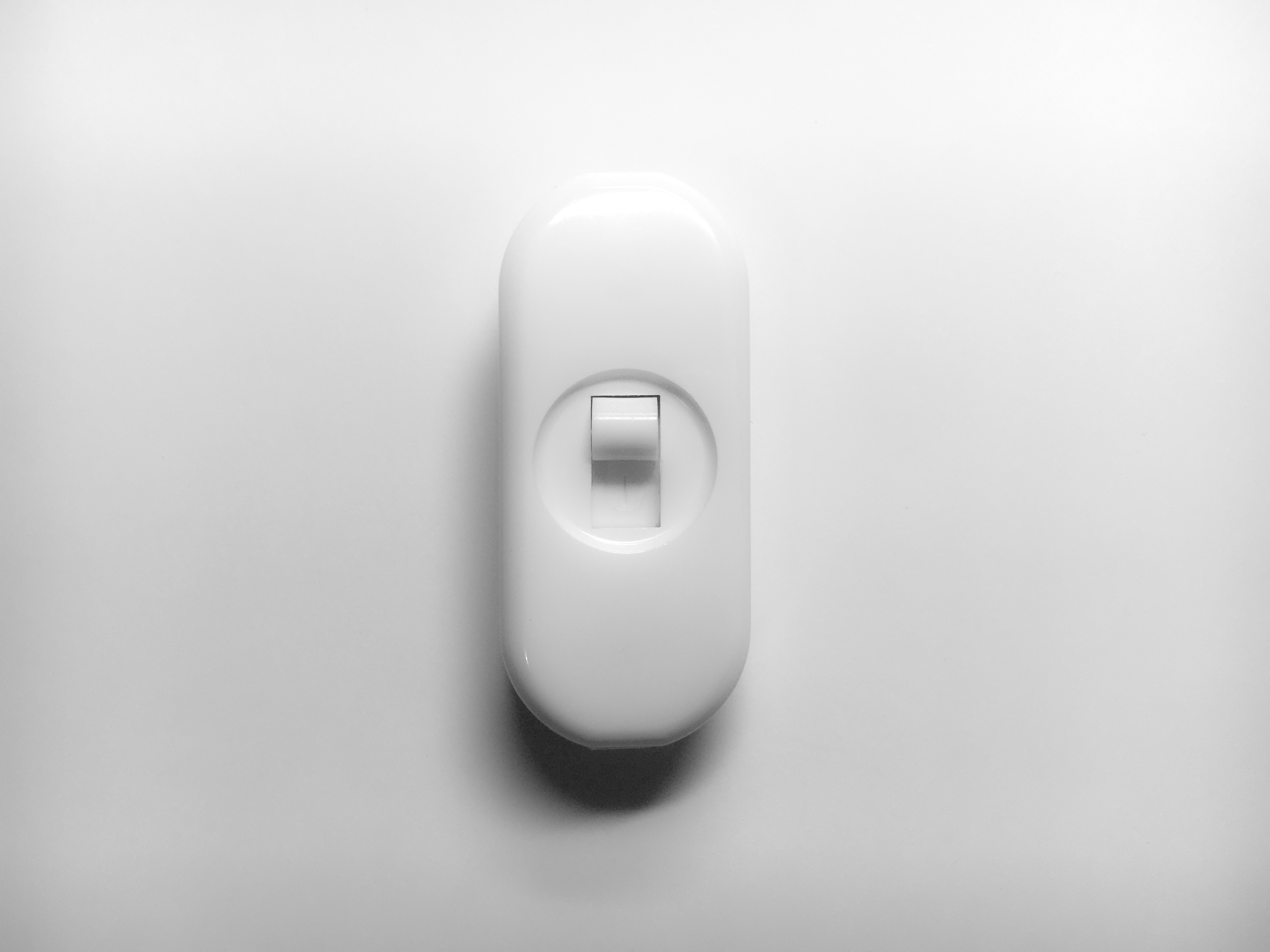
Light switch designed for VLM (1968)

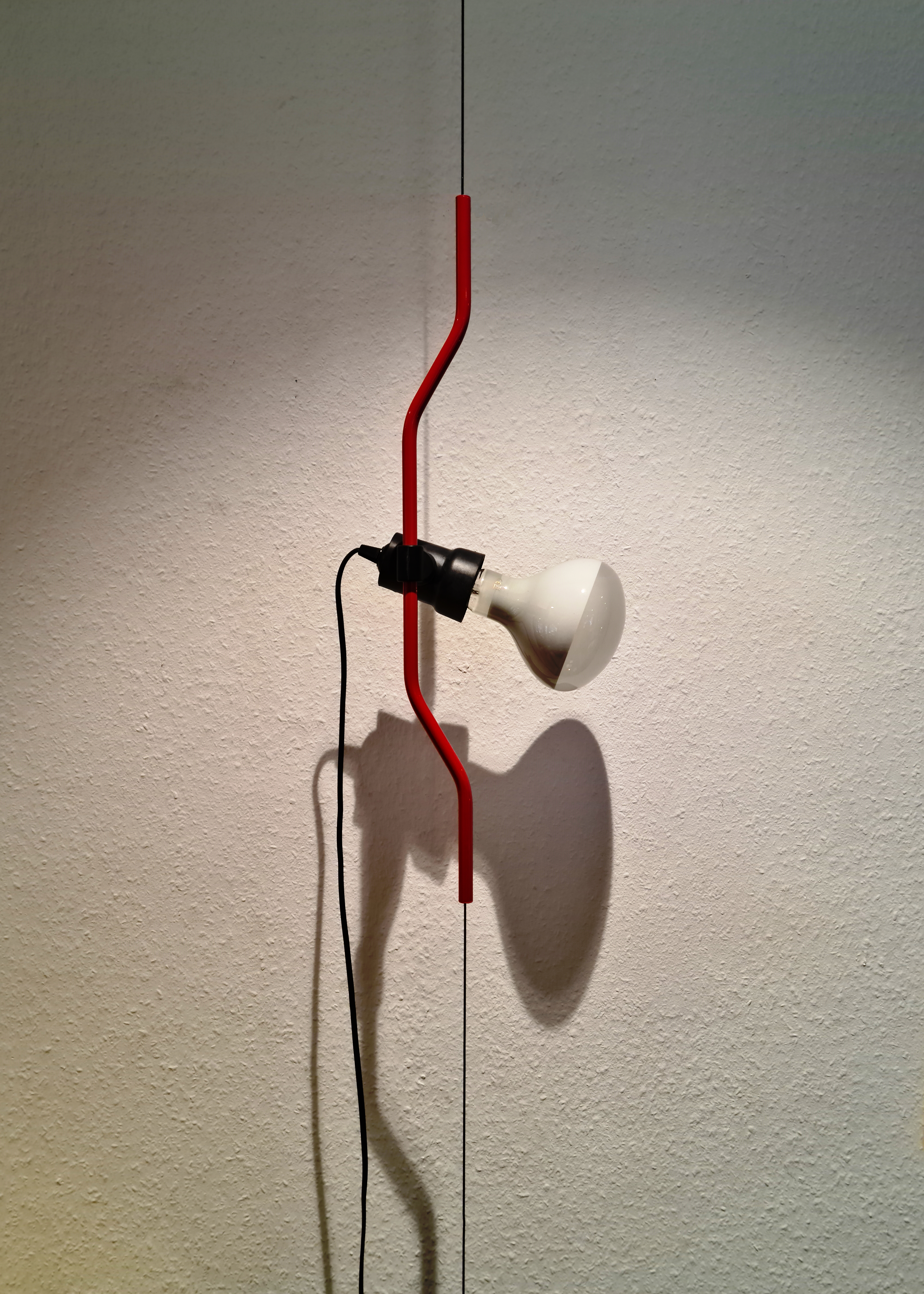
Parentesi suspension lamp designed for Flos from Pio Manzù concept sketch (1971)

== Legacy ==
Throughout his lifetime, Castiglioni received many awards and distinctions for his designs, including eight Compasso d'Oro awards, as well as the Compasso d'Oro Career Award "for having raised design to the highest values of culture through his irreplaceable experience." His designs are held in museum collections around the world and several books have been published about his life and work.

In 1997, the Museum of Modern Art (MoMA) in New York staged a retrospective of his life and work titled: "Achille Castiglioni: Design!". The exhibition was curated by Paola Antonelli, who also wrote the catalogue.

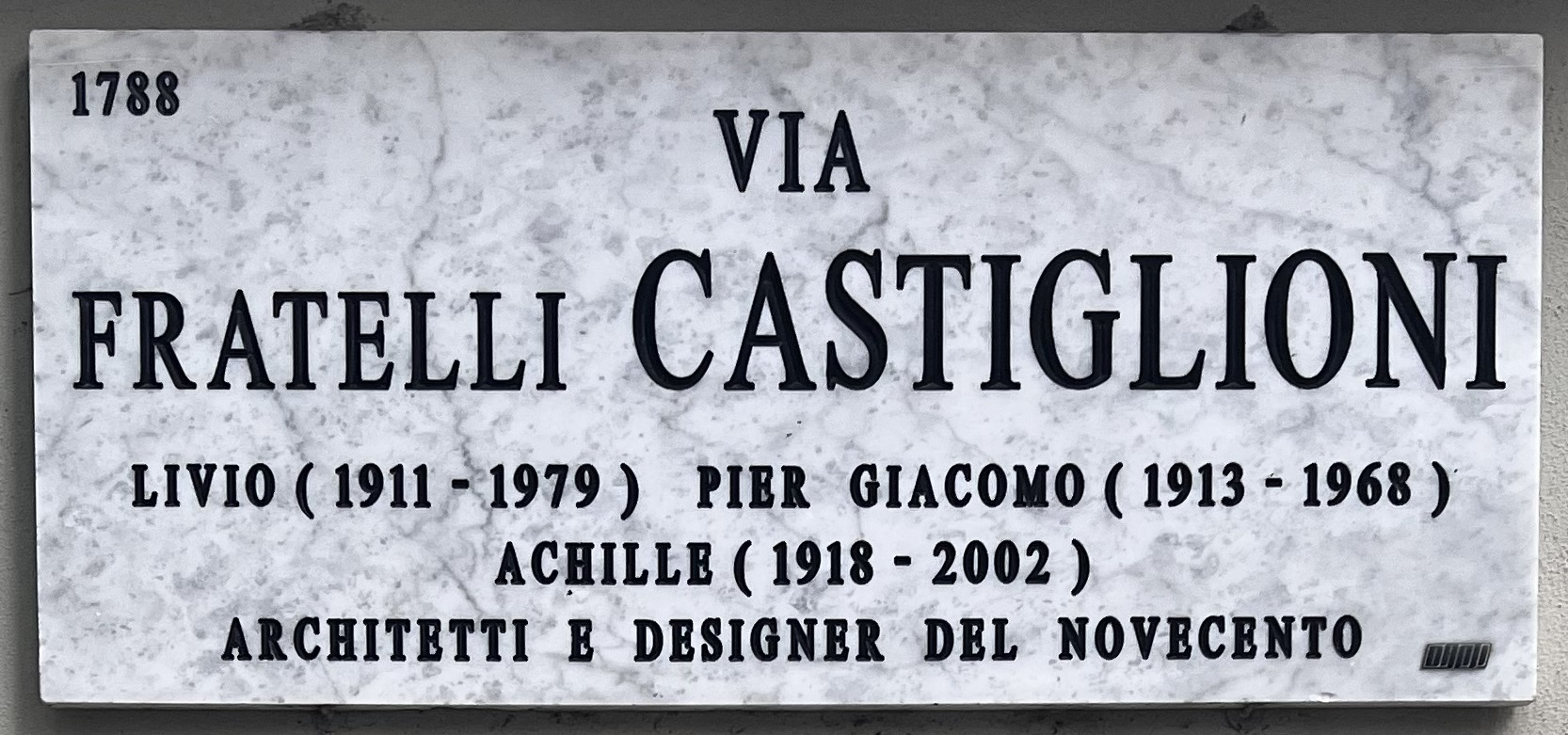
In 2014 the city of Milan named a street after the three Castiglioni brothers (Via Fratelli Castiglioni).

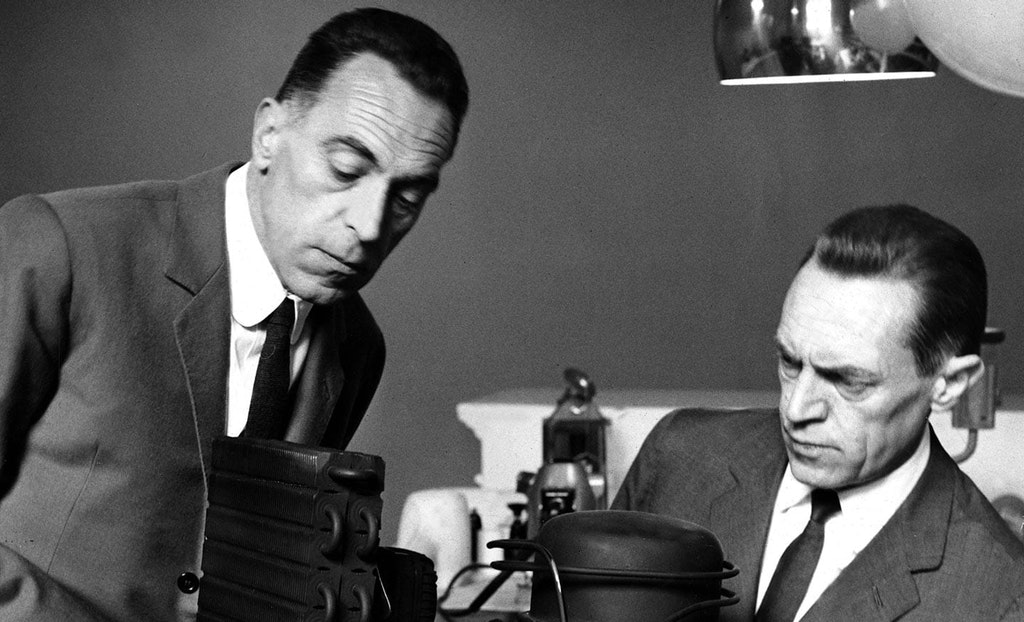
With brother Pier Giacomo

=== Archives and collections ===
The Studio Museum of the Achille Castiglioni foundation in Milan holds archival records of 191 architectural projects, 484 installation projects and 290 industrial design projects. A total of c. 11,500 technical drawings and freehand sketches is complemented by 130 plastic models, boxes and drawers containing photographs, slides, glass plates and negatives, videocassettes, DVDs, audio cassettes, extracts from magazines, books, catalogues, and objects collected by Achille Castiglioni.

Additional Achille and Pier Giacomo Castiglioni works and archives are held by the University of Parma.

Museums which hold Castiglioni's works in their collections include the Museum of Modern Art (MoMA) in New York, Victoria and Albert Museum (V&A) in London, Kunstgewerbe Museum in Zurich, Staatliches Museum für angewandte Kunst in Munich, Design Museum in Prato, Israel Museum in Jerusalem, Denver Art Museum, Vitra Design Museum in Weil am Rhein, the Museum Angewandte Kunst in Frankfurt, and the Museum für Angewandte Kunst Cologne, the Pompidou Centre in Paris, and the ADI Design Museum in Milan.

=== Awards and honours ===
- 1947 Milan Triennale Bronze Medal
- 1951 Milan Triennale Grand Prix
- 1954 Milan Triennale Grand Prix
- 1955 Compasso d'oro Award, Luminator lamp (with Pier Giacomo Castiglioni)
- 1957 Milan Triennale Gold Medal
- 1957 Milan Triennale Silver Medal
- 1960 Compasso d'oro Award, T12 Palini chair (with Pier Giacomo Castiglioni and Luigi Caccia Dominioni)
- 1960 Milan Triennale Gold Medal
- 1962 Compasso d'oro Award, l la caffè Pitagora (with Pier Giacomo Castiglioni)
- 1963 Milan Triennale Silver Medal
- 1964 Compasso d'oro Award, Spinamatic beer dispenser (with Pier Giacomo Castiglioni)
- 1967 Compasso d'oro Award, Phoebus headset for simultaneous translations (with Pier Giacomo Castiglioni)
- 1979 Compasso d'oro Award, Parentesi lamp
- 1979 Compasso d'oro Award, Omsa TR15 hospital bed (with Giancarlo Pozzi and Ernesto Zerbi)
- 1984 Compasso d'oro Award, Dry cutlery
- 1985 Honorary Member of the Advisory Committee, ArtCenter College of Design, Pasadena, California
- 1986 Honorary Member, Royal Designers for Industry of the British Royal Society of Arts
- 1987 Honorary Degree, Royal College of Art in London, UK
- 1989 Compasso d'Oro Career Award
- 1993 Annual Award, Chartered Society of Designers in London, UK
- 1994 Spring of Design Award, Department of Culture, Catalonia, Spain
- 1995 Art sur Table Prize, Conseil National des Art Culinaire, Paris, France
- 1996 IF Design Award from the International Forum Design, Hannover, Germany
- 1996 Longevity (Langlebigkeit) Award from the Design Center in Stuttgart, Germany
- 1999 Domus/INARCH, Lifetime Achievement Award, Milan, Italy
- 1999 "Targa d'Oro" Unione Italiana per il Disegno (UID), Faculty of Architecture, University of Genova, Italy
- 1999 First place in the Competition "Supports for the Environment" organized by Enel, with the Michele De Lucchi
- 2001 Honorary Degree in Industrial Design, Milan Polytechnic University (Politecnico di Milano), Italy

== Partial list of works ==
=== Architecture ===
- 1952–1953 Torre del Palazzo della Permanente, Milan (with Pier Giacomo Castiglioni)
- 1956 Church of San Gabriele Arcangelo in Mater Dei, Milan (with Pier Giacomo Castiglioni)
- 1958 Chamber of Commerce, Industry, and Agriculture, Milan (with Pier Giacomo Castiglioni)
- 1960 Splüghen Braü brewery, Milan (with Pier Giacomo Castiglioni)
- 1968 Omega Shop, Piazza Duomo, Milan (with Pier Giacomo Castiglioni)
- 1969 Casa Castiglioni, Milan

=== Design ===
- 1956 Spalter vacuum cleaner for R.E.M. (with Pier Giacomo Castiglioni)
- 1957 Saliscendi pendant lamp for Stilnovo (with Pier Giacomo Castiglioni)
- 1957 Sella stool for Zanotta (with Pier Giacomo Castiglioni) (pictured)
- 1957 Mezzadro stool for Zanotta (with Pier Giacomo Castiglioni) (pictured)
- 1957 Cubo couch and armchair collection for Arflex, and subsequently Meritalia (with Pier Giacomo Castiglioni)
- 1959 Lierna chair for Cassina e Gavina, and subsequently reissued in 2014 by the Fondazione Castiglioni (with Pier Giacomo Castiglioni)
- 1959 Dolce cutlery for Reed & Barton, and subsequently reissued as Grand Prix in 1996 by Alessi (with Pier Giacomo Castiglioni)
- 1960 Sanluca lounge chair for Gavina, and subsequently Knoll, Bernini, then Poltrona Frau (with Pier Giacomo Castiglioni)
- 1960 Taraxacum chandelier for Heisenkeil, and subsequently Flos (with Pier Giacomo Castiglioni)
- 1962 Gatto Gatto Piccolo, table lamps for Heisenkeil, and subsequently Flos (with Pier Giacomo Castiglioni)
- 1962 Sleek serving spoons for Kraft and Alessi, (with Pier Giacomo Castiglioni)
- 1962 Toio floor lamp Flos, (with Pier Giacomo Castiglioni)
- 1962 Taccia table lamp Flos, (with Pier Giacomo Castiglioni)
- 1962 Arco floor lamp for Flos (with Pier Giacomo Castiglioni)
- 1964 Splüghen Braü pendant light for Flos (with Pier Giacomo Castiglioni)
- 1964 RR 126 radiogram for Brionvega (with Pier Giacomo Castiglioni) (pictured)
- 1965 Orseggi glasses, carafe, and decanter for Arnolfo di Cambio e Alessi (with Pier Giacomo Castiglioni)
- 1965 Firenze wall clock for Lorenz e Alessi (with Pier Giacomo Castiglioni)
- 1965 Tric, folding chair for BBB (with Pier Giacomo Castiglioni)
- 1966 Allunaggio chair for Zanotta (with Pier Giacomo Castiglioni)
- 1967 Snoopy table lamp for Flos (with Pier Giacomo Castiglioni)
- 1968 Interruttore Rompitratta electric switch for VLM (with Pier Giacomo Castiglioni)
- 1970 Primate chair for Zanotta
- 1970 Parentesi suspension light for Flos (from Pio Manzù concept sketch)
- 1971 Spirale ashtray for Alessi
- 1972 Lampadina table lamp for Flos
- 1972 Noce table and wall lamp for Flos
- 1975 Aoy table lamp for Flos
- 1976 Bibip floor lamp for Flos
- 1977 Cumano tripod table for Zanotta
- 1978 Frisbi suspension lamp Flos
- 1979 Ginevra folding chair BBB
- 1980 Gibigiana table lamp for Flos
- 1980 Acetoliera cruet set for Rossi & Arcandi (and later for Alessi from 1984)
- 1982 Dry silverware for Alessi
- 1982 Moni lamp for Flos
- 1982 Giovi lamp for Flos
- 1983 Paro Glassware for Danese
- 1983 Ovio Glasses and Caraffe for Danese
- 1984 Stylos, floor lamp for Flos
- 1987 Basello small table
- 1988 Taraxacum88 floor lamp for Flos
- 1989 Record wristwatch for Alessi (pictured)
- 1990 Joy furniture for Zanotta
- 1992 Brera lamp for Flos
- 1995 Fruttiera scolatoio fruit bowl for Alessi
- 1995 Tavolo 95 table for De Padova
- 1995 Mate,Supremate, and Minimate, vases for De Padova
- 1996 Scrittarello writing desk for De Padova
- 1996 Fucsia lighting collection for Flos
- 1997 Bavero tableware for Alessi
- 1998 Diabolo lamp for Flos
- 2001 CENTO3 writing instruments, posthumously produced by EGO.M (with Gianfranco Cavaglià)

Selected examples

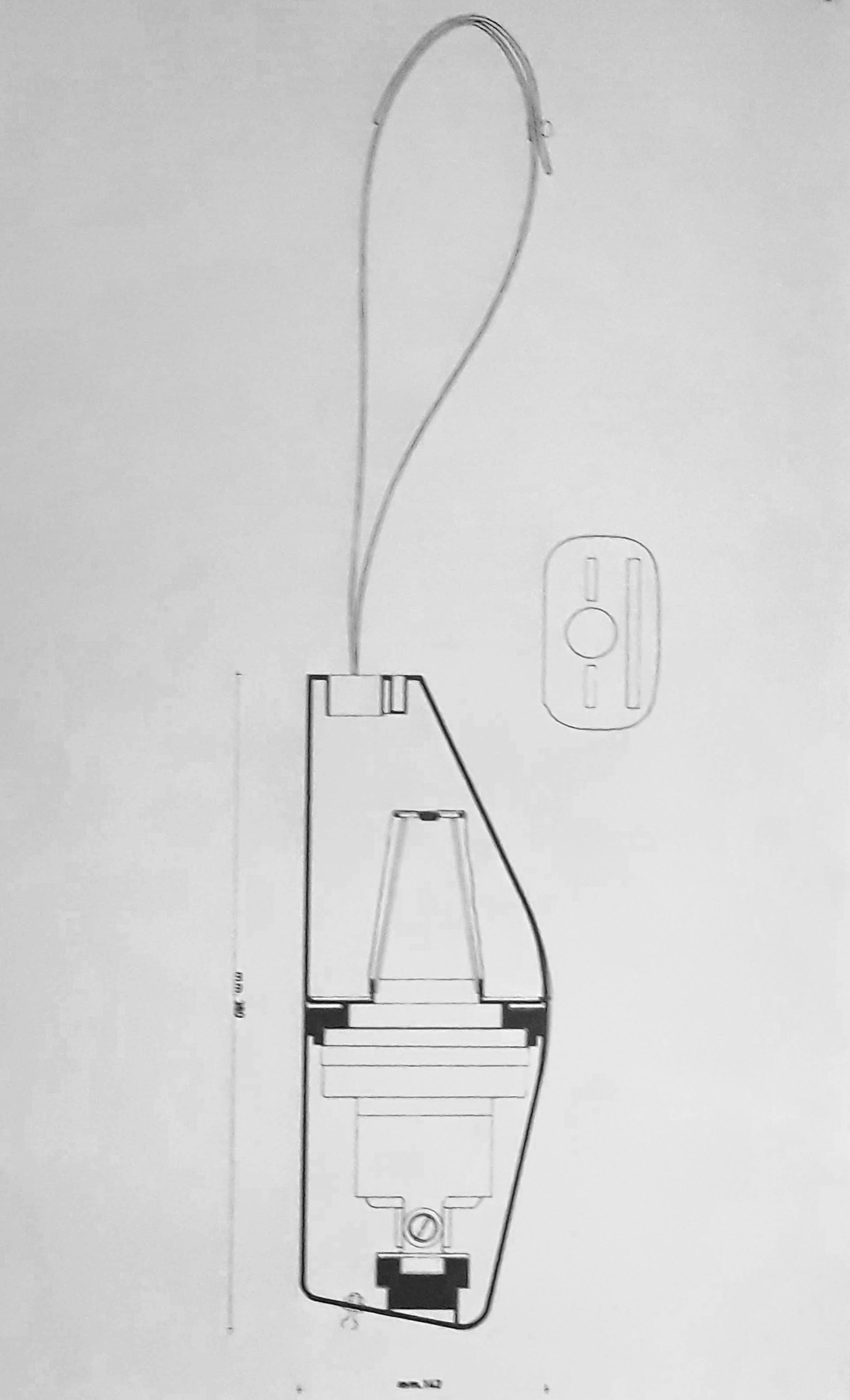
Spalter vacuum cleaner designed for R.E.M. (1956)

Sanluca armchair designed for Gavina (1959)

Arco floor lamp designed for Flos (1962)

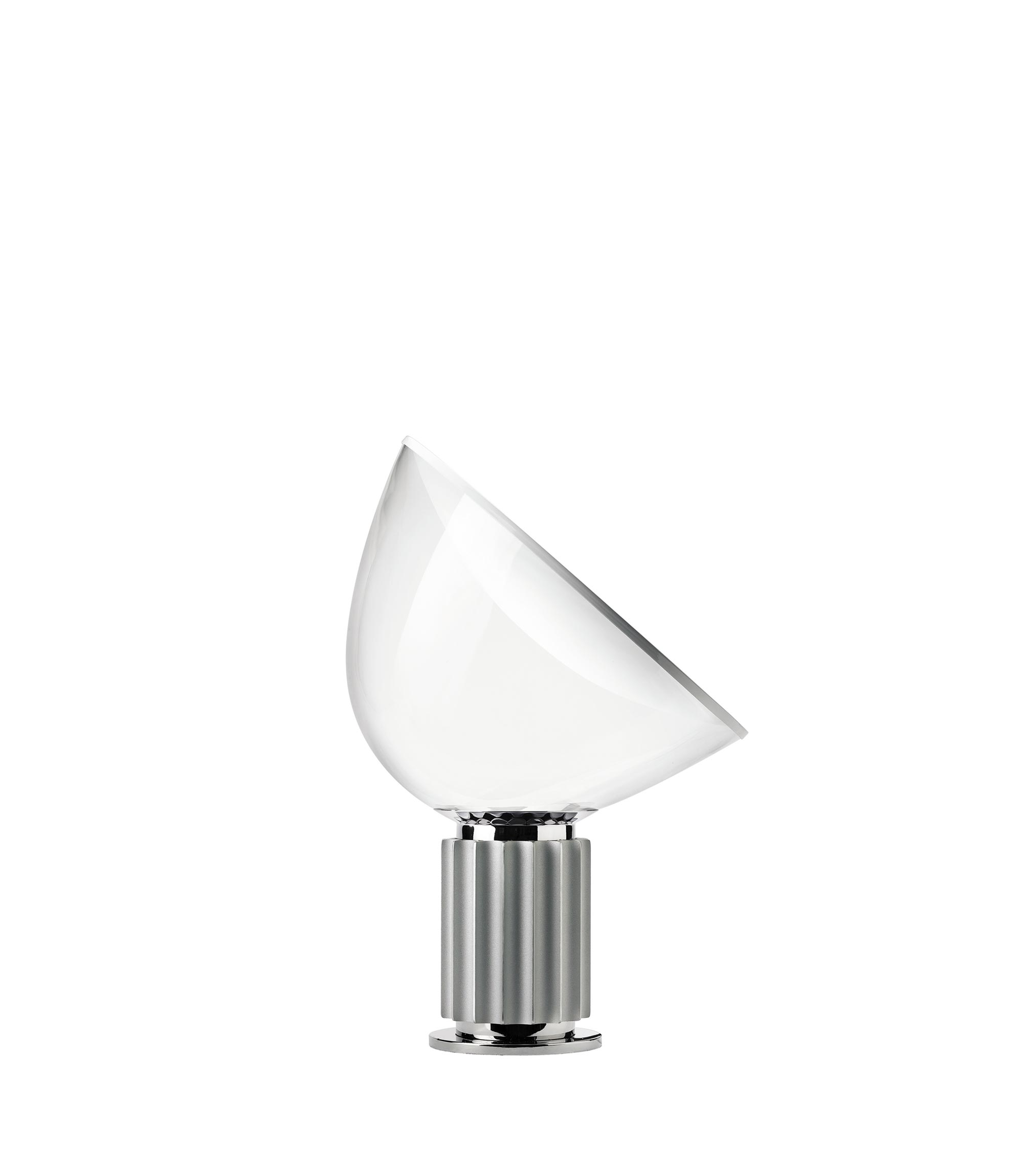
Taccia lamp designed for Flos (1962)

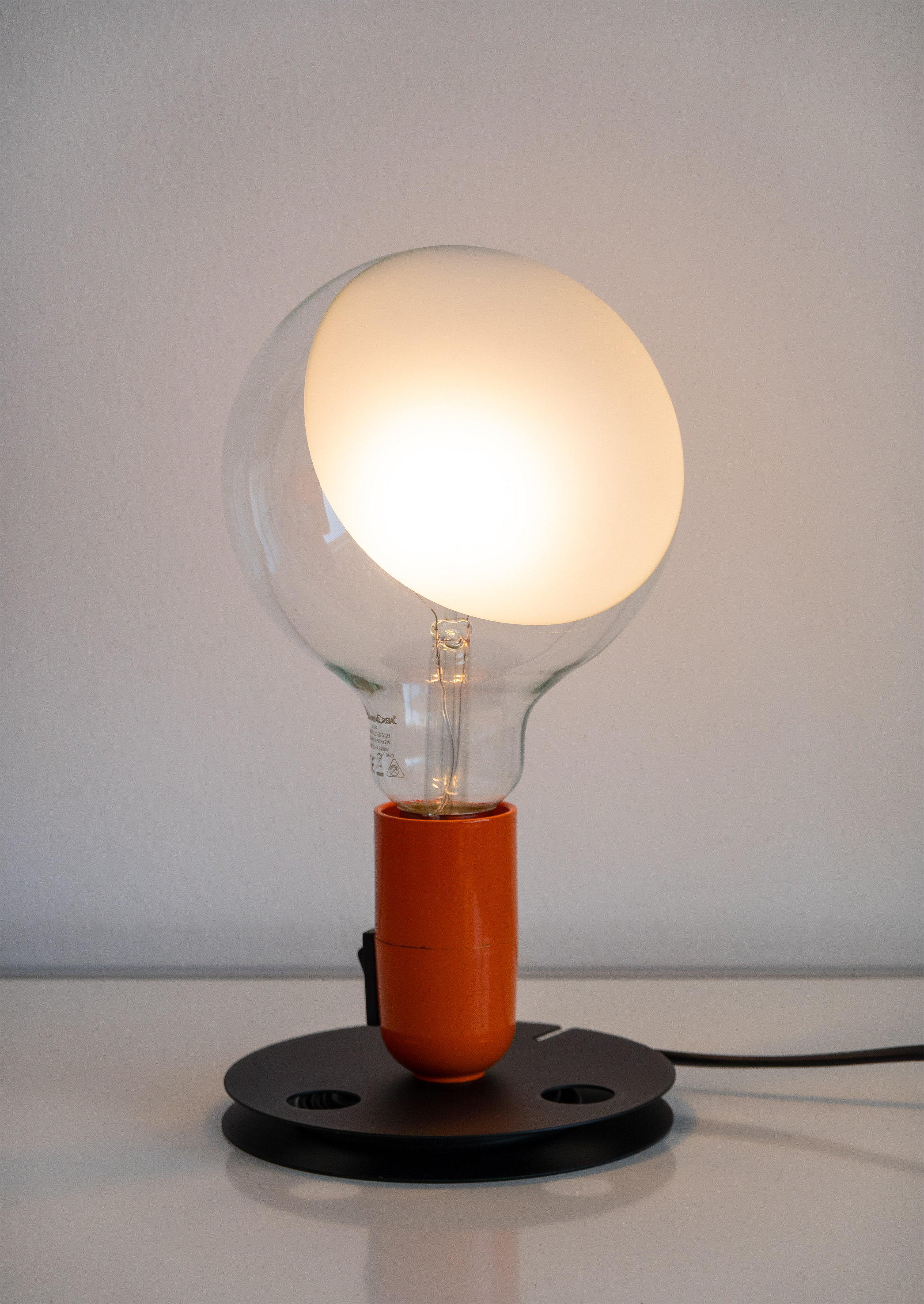
Lampadina table lamp for Flos (1972)

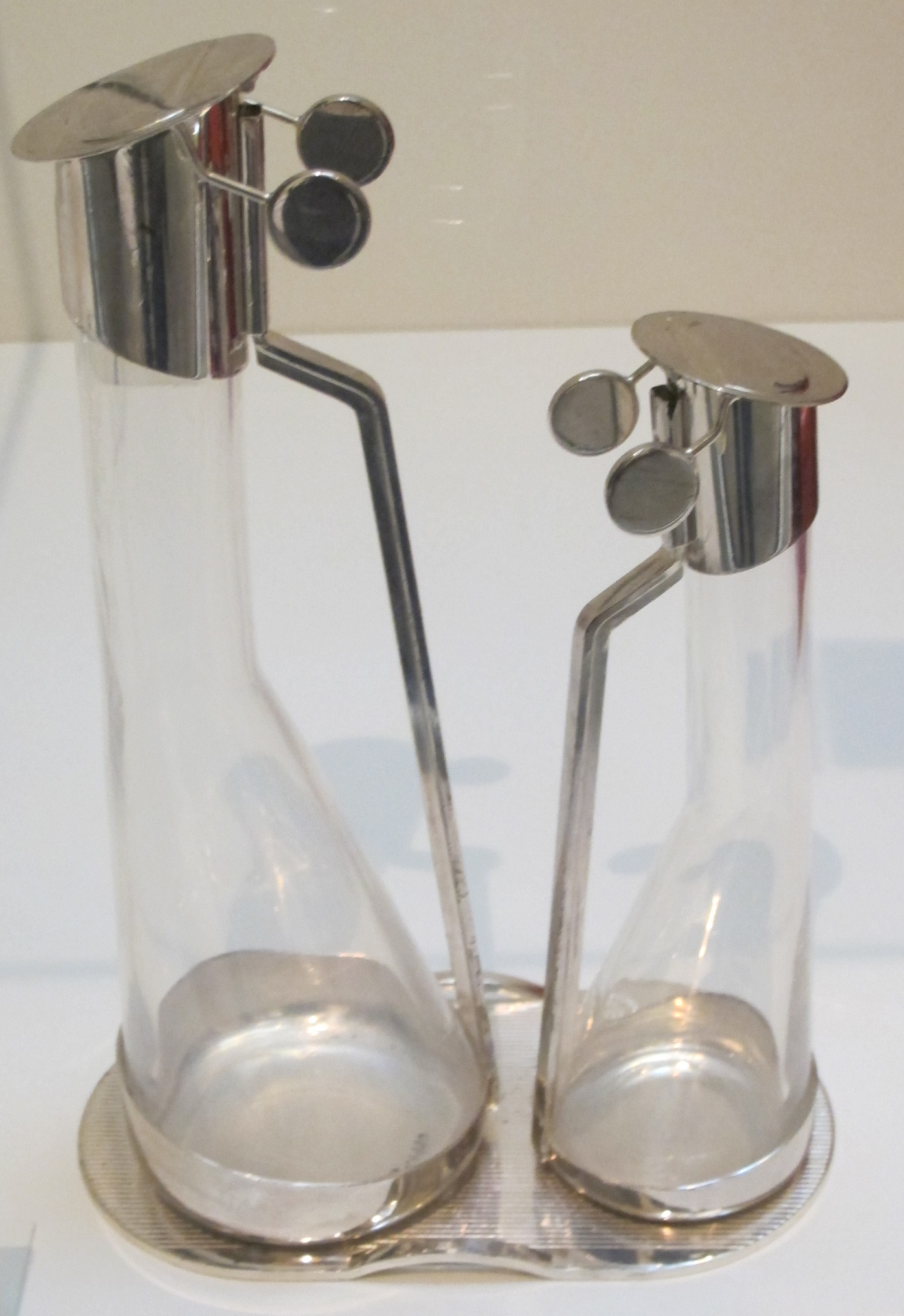
Silver cruet set designed for Rossi & Arcandi (1980)

=== Exhibition design and interior architecture ===
- 1954 Industrial Design Pavilion, Palazzo dell'Arte Bernocchi, X Triennale, Milan (with Pier Giacomo Castiglioni)
- 1957 "Colour and Form in the Modern Home" exhibit, Villa Olmo Como, Italy (with Pier Giacomo Castiglioni)
- 1963 "Vie d'acqua da Milano al mare", Palazzo Reale, Milan (with Pier Giacomo Castiglioni)
- 1965 "La casa abitata", Palazzo Strozzi, Florence (with Pier Giacomo Castiglioni)
- 1984 "Achille Castiglioni", Austrian Museum für Angewandte Kunst, Vienna
- 1988 "Le città del mondo e il futuro delle metropoli", XVII Triennale, Palazzo dell'arte, Milan
- 1995 "A la Castiglioni", Centre d'Art Santa Monica, Barcellona

Industrial Design Pavilion, X Triennale di Milano, 1954 Palazzo dell'Arte Bernocchi. Photography Paolo Monti.

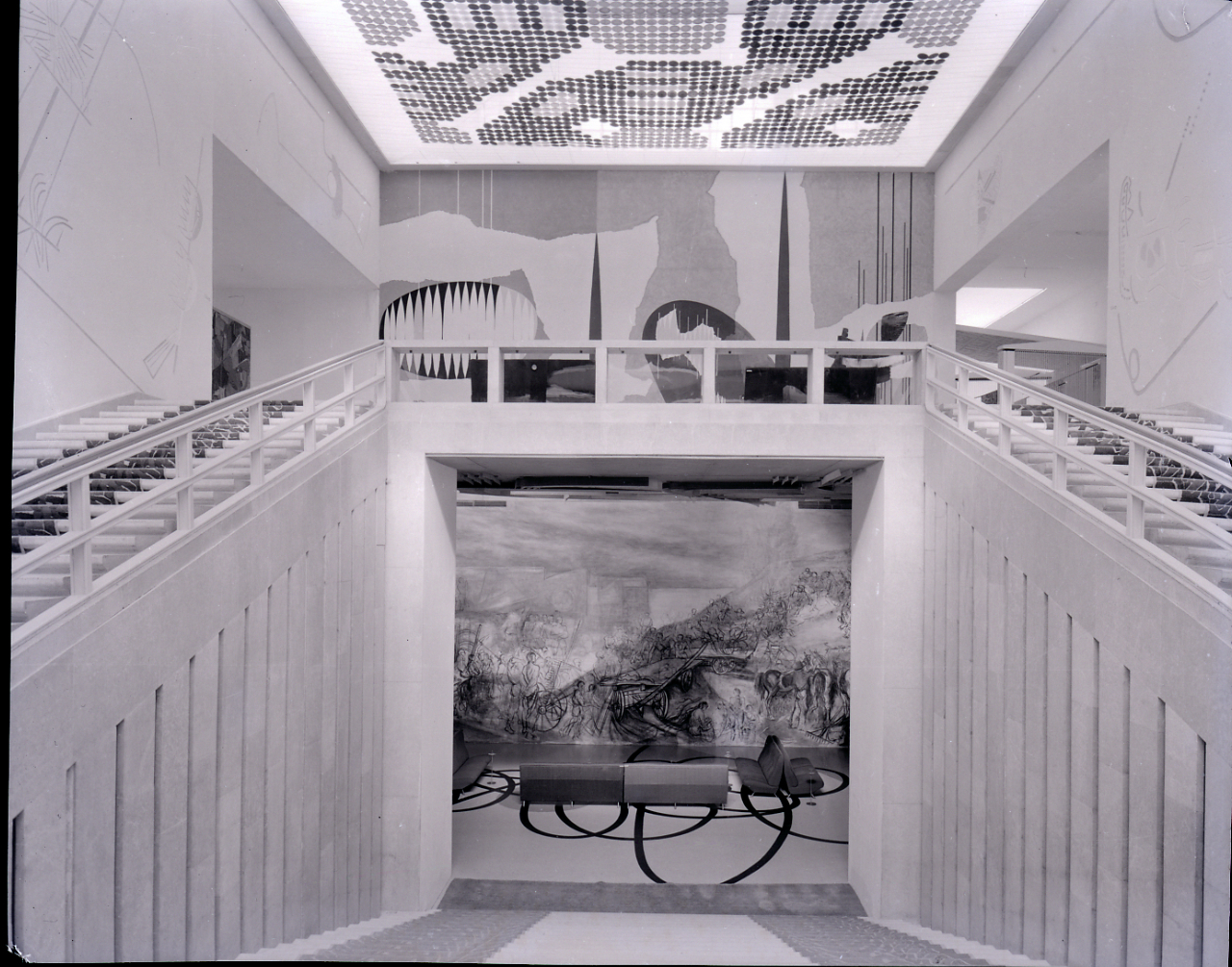

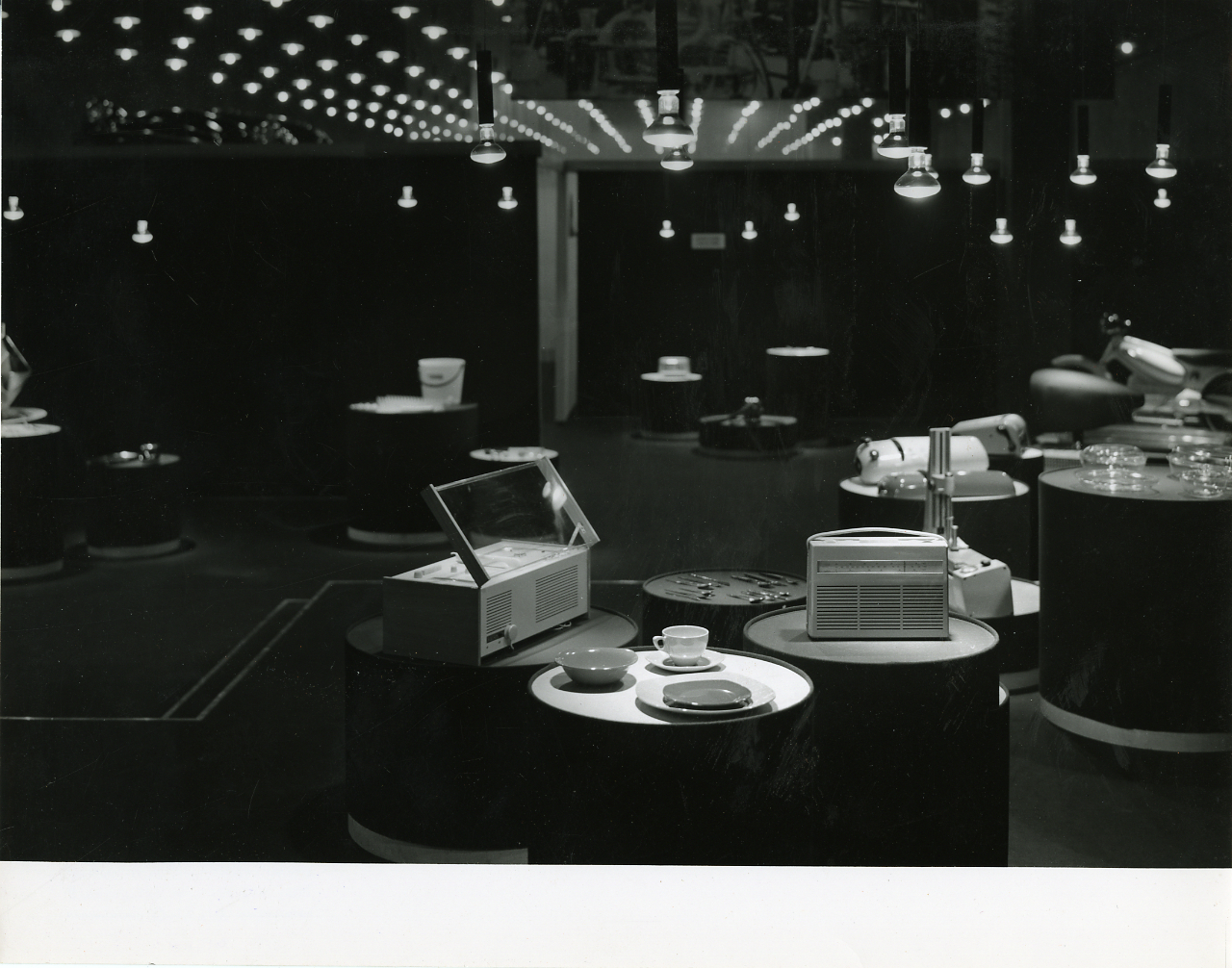

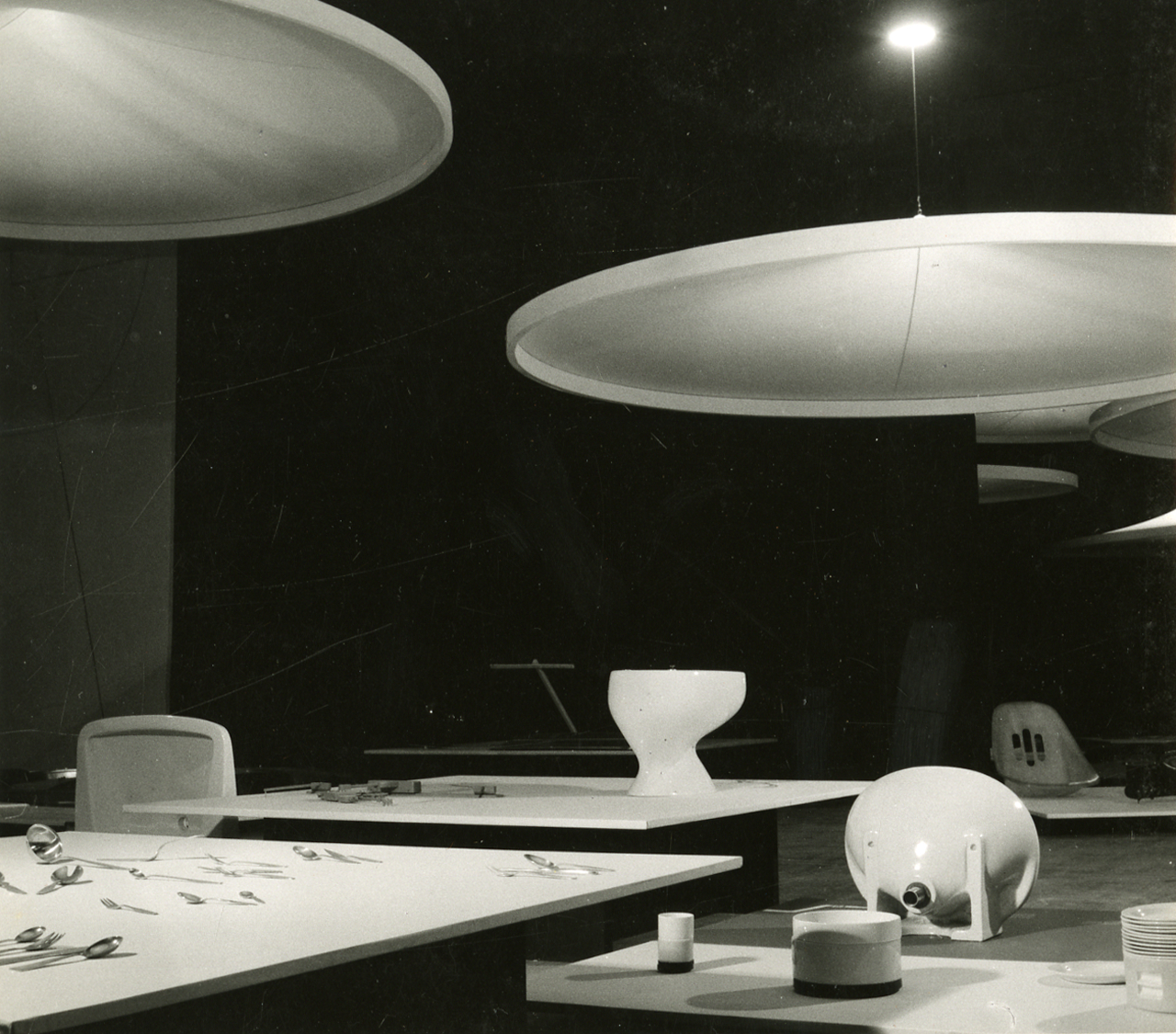

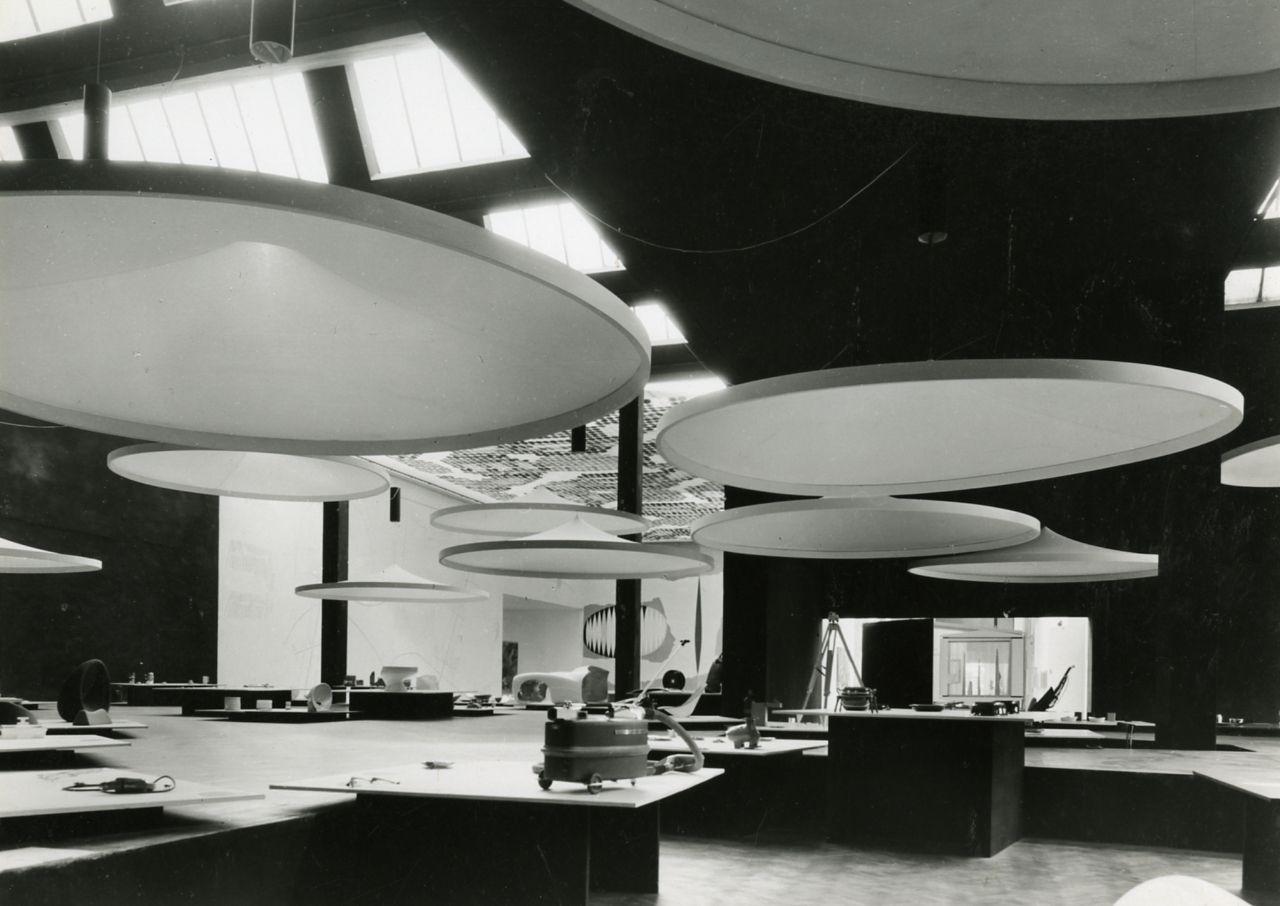

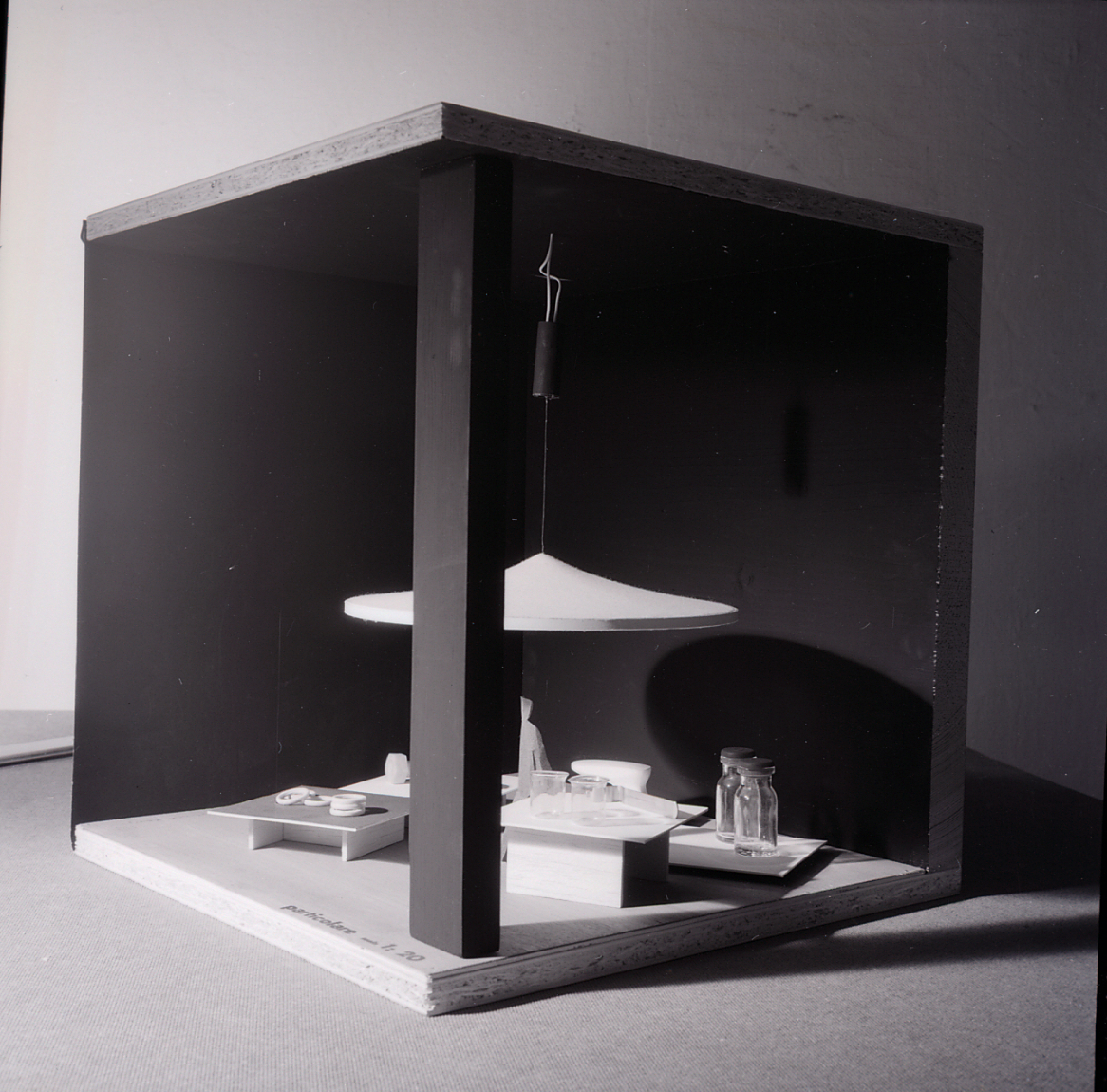
Scale model

== Notes and references ==
=== Further reading ===
- Dizionario enciclopedico di architettura e urbanistica (in Italian). Vol. III. Roma: Istituto Editoriale Romano. 1969. p. 510.
- MacMillan Encyclopedia of Architects. New York: The Free Press. 1982. p. 392.
- Sparke, Penny (1988). Design in Italy: 1870 to the present (1 ed.). New York: Abbeville Press. ISBN 0-89659-884-5. OCLC 17548762.
- Antonelli, Paola; Guernaccia, Steven (2000). Achille Castiglioni (1 ed.). Mantova: Edizioni Corraini. ISBN 88-87942-02-1. OCLC 47283354.
- Olmo, C., ed. (2000). Dizionario dell'architettura del XX secolo (in Italian). Torino: Allemandi. pp. 34–36.
- Dardi, D. (2001). Achille Castiglioni (in Italian). Torino: Testo & Immagine.
- Polano, S. (2001). Achille Castiglioni tutte le opere 1938–2000 (in Italian). Milano: Electa.
- Ciagà, G.L., ed. (2003). Gli archivi di architettura in Lombardia. Censimento delle fonti (in Italian). Milano: CASVA. p. 56.
- Fiell, Charlotte; Fiell, Peter (2005). Design of the 20th Century (25th anniversary ed.). Köln: Taschen. pp. 148–153. ISBN 9783822840788. OCLC 809539744.
- Cavaglia, G. (2006). Di Achille Castiglioni (in Italian). Mantova: Edizioni Corraini.
- Taki, Y. (2007). Design as a Quest for Freedom. Axis.
- Vercelloni, M. (2011). Achille e Pier Giacomo Castiglioni (in Italian). Milano: 24 Ore Cultura.
- Ciagà, G.L., ed. (2012). Gli archivi di architettura design e grafica in Lombardia. Censimento delle fonti. Quaderni del CASVA, 11 (in Italian). Milano: CASVA.
- Bettinelli, Eugenio (2014). La voce del maestro: Achille Castiglioni [The master's voice: Achille Castiglioni] (in Italian). Achille Castiglioni. Mantova. ISBN 978-88-7570-442-1. OCLC 881825757.
- Castiglioni, Carlo; Castiglioni, Livia (2022). Affetti e oggetti : cenni di un'antropologia famigliare alla Castiglioni (in Italian). Mantova: Corraini. ISBN 978-88-7570-987-7. OCLC 1306201942.
- Ferrari, Paolo (1984). Achille Castiglioni. Achille Castiglioni. Milano: Electa. ISBN 88-435-1046-0. OCLC 15540497.
