= Dairy machinery =

Dairy machinery encompasses and describes a wide range of machine types that are involved in the production and processing of dairy related products such as yogurt, ice cream, processed cheese, desserts and is a slightly different genre to pure milking machinery.

== Machine types ==
Dairy processing machine types include Homogenizer, Separator (milk), Batch mixers, Continuous freezers, Aseptic, UHT & ESL Filling & Process machinery, Butter & Cheese Processing & Packing, CIP and Washing, Non Aseptic Filling Machines, Ageing Vats, Batch Freezers, Batch Pasteurisers, Ice Cream Filling Machines, Ice Cream Fruit Feeders, Ice Cream Ripple machines, Mixers, Emulsifiers, Cutters, Pasteurisers, Separators, Bactofuge and Clarifier packing machines.

== Companies ==
There are a number of manufacturers that specialise in dairy machinery including Alfa Laval, APV plc, Benhil, GEA, Technogel, Tetra Pak, Cattabriga, Promag, ROKK, Carpigiani, Gram, Seital SPX, Stephan and Mark.

== History ==
Nancy Johnson invented the ice cream maker in 1843. It was operated with a hand crank and revolutionised ice cream production. Jacob Fussell ice cream from Baltimore established the first factory for industrially produced ice cream on 15 June 1851 in Seven Valleys, Pennsylvania. Carl von Linde discovered a refrigeration cycle and invented the first industrial-scale air separation and gas liquefaction processes which is the basis of today's industrial and continuous freezers which allow mass production of ice cream, possibly the largest sector in dairy machinery production.
