= Zanotta =

- 14568 Zanotta, minor planet
- Zanotta (company), Italian company
