= Cascade refrigeration =

Refrigeration process

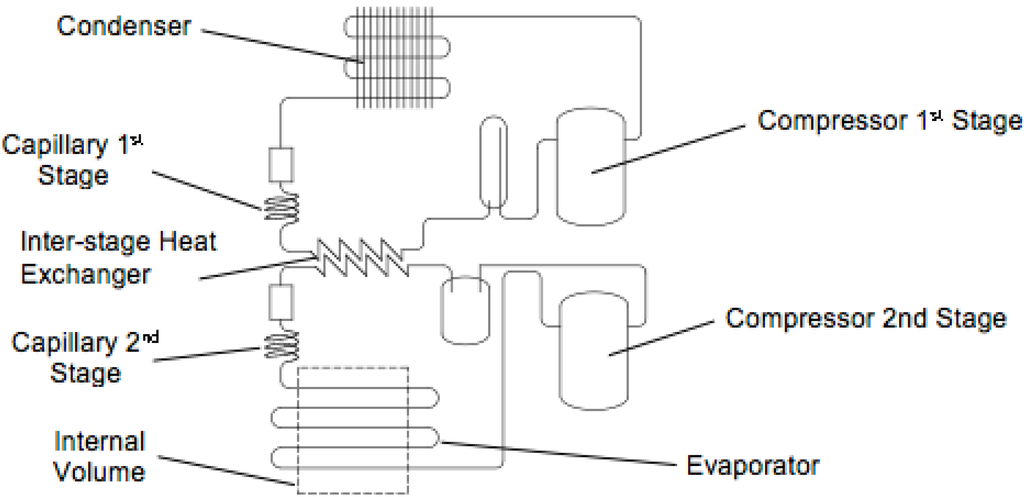
A two-cycle cascade refrigeration process schematic diagram

This is an auto-cascade process with two different refrigerants. The high-temperature refrigerant (red) condenses in the air condenser and is then separated and evaporated to cool the heat exchanger, which condenses the low-temperature refrigerant (blue). Purple signifies a mixture of both refrigerants.

A cascade refrigeration cycle is a multi-stage thermodynamic cycle. An example two-stage process is shown at right (bottom on mobile). The cascade cycle is often employed for devices such as ULT freezers.

== Mechanism ==
In a cascade refrigeration system, two or more vapor-compression cycles with different refrigerants are used. The evaporation-condensation temperatures of each cycle are sequentially lower with some overlap to cover the total temperature drop desired, with refrigerants selected to work efficiently in the temperature range they cover. The low temperature system removes heat from the space to be cooled using an evaporator, and transfers it to a heat exchanger that is cooled by the evaporation of the refrigerant of the high temperature system. Alternatively, a liquid-to-liquid or similar heat exchanger may be used instead. The high-temperature system transfers heat to a conventional condenser that carries the entire heat output of the system and may be passive, fan, or water-cooled.

Cascade cycles may be separated by either being sealed in separated loops or in what is referred to as an "auto-cascade", where the gases are compressed as a mixture but separated as one refrigerant condenses into a liquid while the other continues as a gas through the rest of the cycle. Although an auto-cascade introduces several constraints on the design and operating conditions of the system that may reduce the efficiency, it is often used in small systems due to only requiring a single compressor or in cryogenic systems as it reduces the need for high-efficiency heat exchangers to prevent the compressors leaking heat into the cryogenic cycles. Both types can be used in the same system, generally with the separate cycles being the first stage(s) and the auto-cascade being the last stage. ULT freezers with dual cooling systems use the auto-cascade system. Dual cooling systems are used for redundancy to protect from single compressor failure.

Peltier coolers may also be cascaded into a multi-stage system to achieve lower temperatures. Here, the hot side of the first Peltier cooler is cooled by the cold side of the second Peltier cooler, which is larger in size, whose hot side is in turn cooled by the cold side of an even larger Peltier cooler, and so on. Efficiency drops very rapidly as more stages are added but for very small heat loads down to near-cryogenic temperatures this can often be an effective solution due to being compact and low cost, such as in mid-range thermographic cameras. A two stage Peltier cooler can achieve around -30°C, -75°C with three stages, -85°C with four stages, -100°C with six stages, and -123°C with seven stages. Refrigeration power and efficiency are low but Peltier coolers can be small, for small cooling loads resulting in overall low power consumption for a Peltier cooler with three stages. For a Peltier cooler with seven stages, power consumption can be 65 W with a cooling capacity of 80 mW.

== See also ==
- Continuous freezers
