= Sergio Asti =

Italian architect and designer (1926–2021)

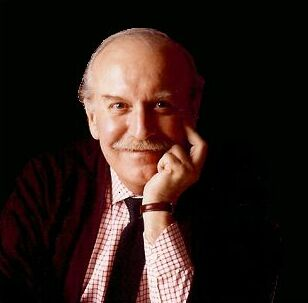
- Born: 25 May 1926; Milan, Italy
- Died: 27 July 2021 (aged 95); Milan, Italy
- Education: Polytechnic University of Milan
- Occupations: industrial designer; architect

Sergio Asti (25 May 1926 – 27 July 2021) was an Italian designer and architect, primarily known for his industrial designs for firms such as Artemide, Brionvega, FontanaArte, Gabbianelli, Heller, Knoll, Salviati, and Zanotta.

== Life and career ==
Asti was born in Milan. After receiving his degree in architecture at the Polytechnic University of Milan, he opened his own design studio in 1956. That same year he became one of the founders of the Associazione per il Disegno Industriale.

While still a student he designed a soda syphon for Saccab which became an icon of 1950s Italian design. It was nominated for a Compasso d'Oro in 1956, exhibited at the Milan Triennial exhibition in 1957, and later at the Museum of Modern Art in New York. It is in the permanent collection of the Triennale di Milano museum. He went on to win the Compasso d'Oro in 1962 for his glass vase "Marco" manufactured by Salvati, examples of which are in the permanent collections of the Museum of Modern Art and the Victoria and Albert Museum.

Other designs by Asti include the "Dada" ceramic teapot held in the Philadelphia Museum of Art, "Boca" stainless steel flatware held in the Rhode Island School of Design Museum and the Cooper Hewitt Museum, and the "Daruma" lamp held in the Museum of Modern Art. Although primarily known for his industrial and interior designs, Asti also designed several buildings, including private houses in Brienno and Arenzano, the latter with his frequent collaborator Sergio Favre (1927–1967).

== Gallery ==
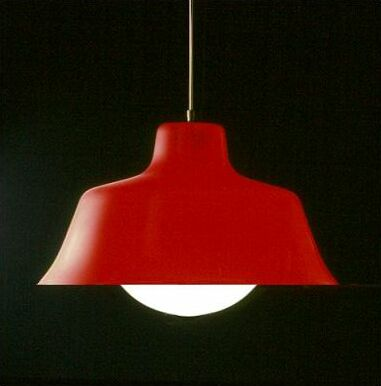
Pendant lamp for Kartell (1954)

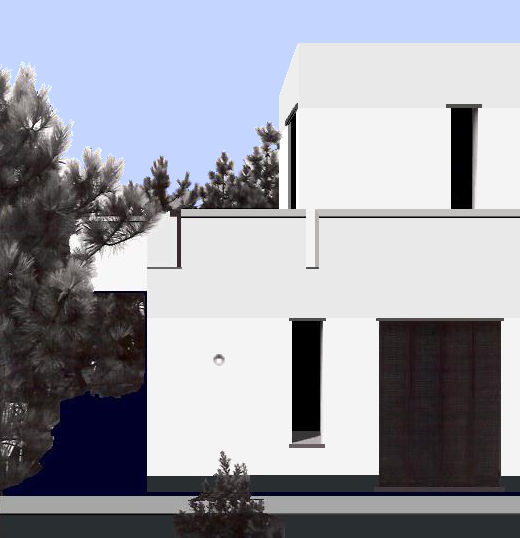
Villa Testa, Arenzano (1960)

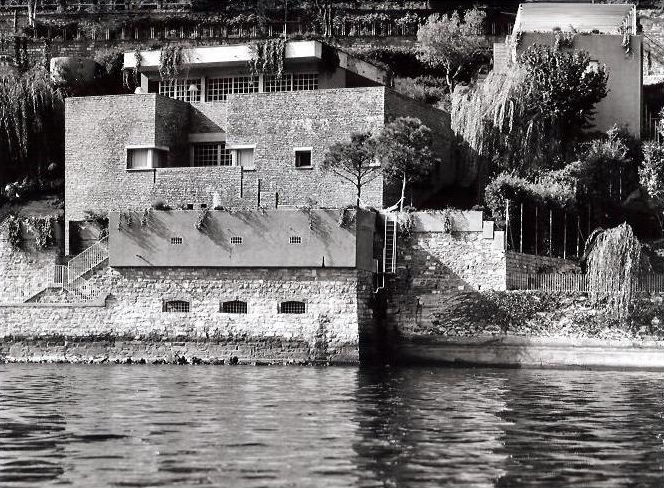
Villa in Brienno (1967)

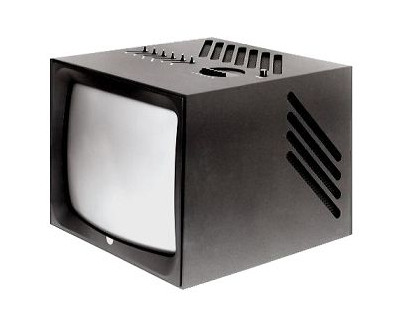
"Pally" television for Brionvega (1973)

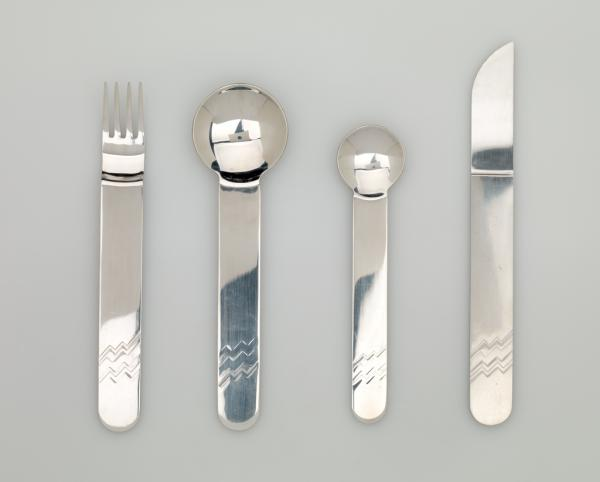
"Boca" stainless steel flatware (1976)

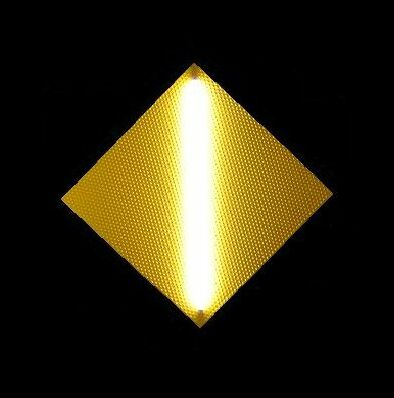
Wall sconce for Superego (1982)

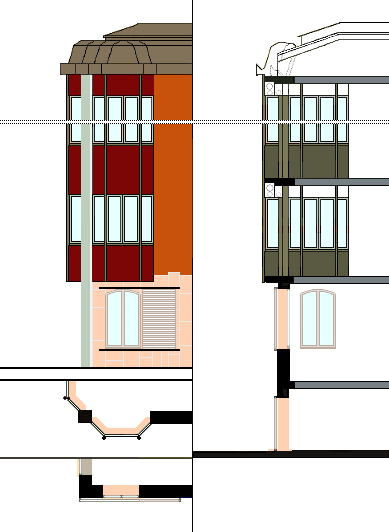
Tizianella, Milan (1961)
