= Dairymaster =

Irish manufacturer of dairy machinery

- Industry: Dairy machinery
- Headquarters: Causeway, County Kerry, Ireland
- Products: Dairy machinery, Milking machines
- Website: www.dairymaster.com

Dairymaster is an Irish manufacturer of dairy machinery headquartered in Causeway, County Kerry.
