= Liisi Beckmann =

Finnish designer and artist

- Born: Liisi Marjatta Meronen; 7 December 1924; Kirvu, Viipuri Province, Finland
- Died: 9 August 2004 (aged 79); Orimattila, Finland
- Occupations: designer; artist

Liisi Beckmann (7 December 1924 – 9 August 2004) was a Finnish designer and artist primarily active in Italy from the late 1950s to the late 1970s. Examples of her work are held in the collections of the Moderna Museet in Stockholm and the Design Museum in Helsinki. Her work has also been exhibited at the Rome Quadriennale, the Museum of Modern Art in New York, the Musée des Arts Décoratifs in Paris, and the Triennale Design Museum in Milan. Her most celebrated design was the Karelia chair, first produced by Zanotta in 1966.

== Life and career ==
She was born Liisi Marjatta Meronen on her parents' farm in Kirvu on the Karelian Isthmus. The Meronen family was forced to evacuate when the Russians invaded and seized the territory at the outbreak of World War II. With their farm razed to the ground and unable to return to Karelia, the family built a new life in Virenoja, a village near Orimattila. She enrolled in the Helsinki School of Arts and Design on the milinary and clothing course, but unbeknownst to her father, also took courses at the Academy of Fine Arts which occupied the same building. She married Hans Beckmann in 1952. Their early married life was spent between Helsinki, Virenoja, and Lübeck in her husband's native Germany. The marriage was not a success and the couple soon began living apart. However, they did not divorce until 1963, and she retained his surname throughout her life.

Beckmann moved to Milan in 1957 where she worked in the development studio of La Rinascente. She went on to design objects and furniture for several Italian firms, including the furniture company Zanotta, the glass company Vetreria Vistosi, the ceramics company Gabbianelli, and the metalware company Valenti. In 1966 she designed her most famous piece, the Karelia easy chair for Zanotta. Constructed in undulating forms of expanded polyurethane foam with a glossy vinyl cover, it became one of Zanotta's cult classics. It was reissued by the company in 2007 and exhibited at Milan's Triennale Design Museum in 2016.

In the late 1960s Beckmann settled in Cassano d'Adda in the outskirts of Milan. She gradually withdrew from designing in the mid-1970s and devoted herself to painting and sculpture. During this period she had a solo exhibition at the Galleria di Naviglio in Milan and exhibited her sculptures Liszt and Marconi at the Rome Quadriennale. Another sculpture from this period, Homo Erectus, is held in the Moderna Museet in Stockholm. Beckmann spent the last years of her life in Finland and died in Orimattila at the age of 79. A retrospective exhibition of her work was held at the Palazzo Berva in Cassano d'Adda in 2015.
