= Ultra-low-temperature freezer =

Freezer used for storing contents at unusually low temperatures

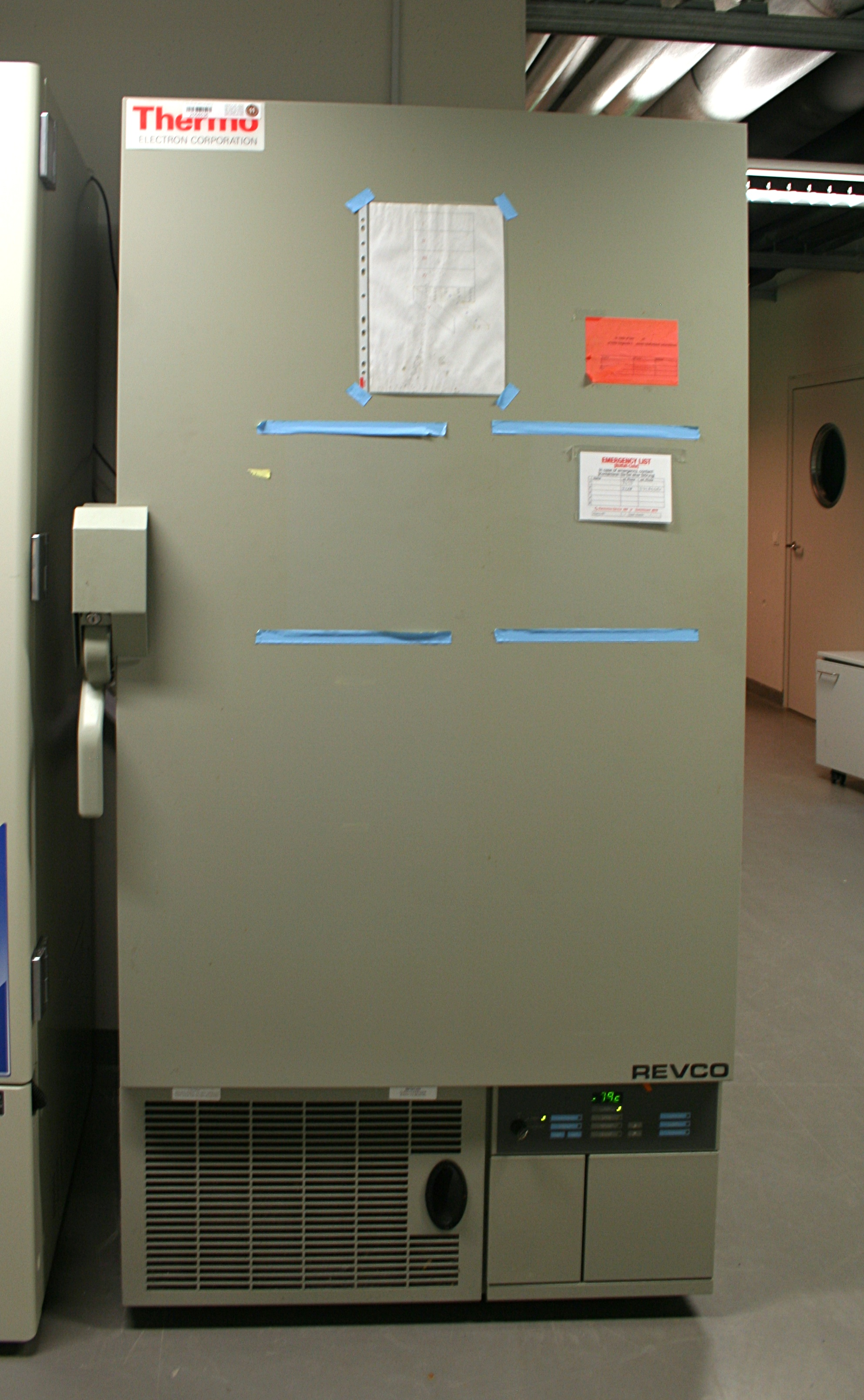
A standard upright negative 80 degree freezer

An ultra low temperature (ULT) freezer is a refrigerator that stores contents at −80 to −86 °C (−112 to −123 °F). An ultra low temperature freezer is commonly referred to as a "minus 80 freezer" or a "negative 80 freezer", referring to the most common temperature standard. ULT freezers come in upright and chest freezer formats.

== Application ==
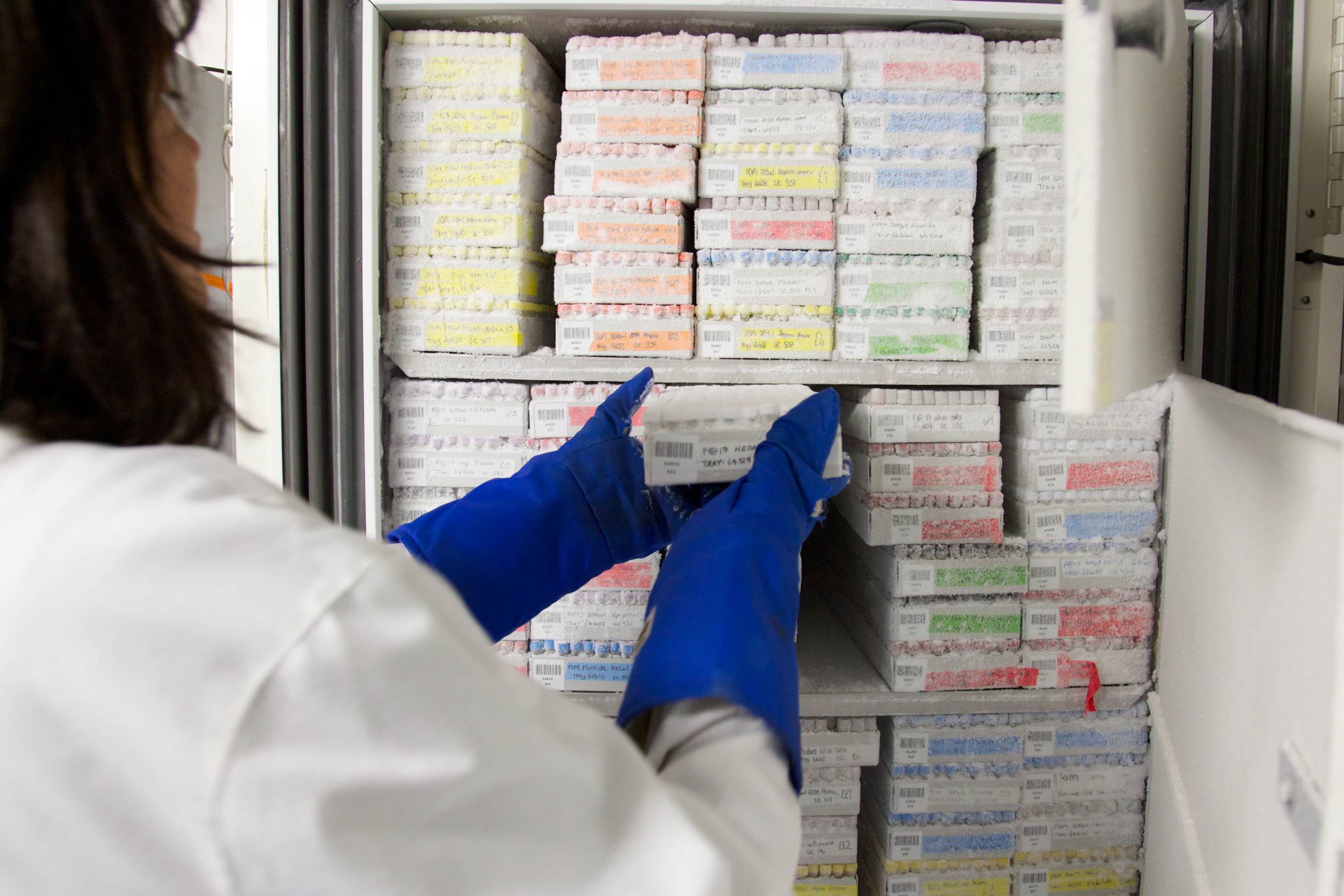
A scientist placing samples into a negative 80 degree freezer

In contrast to short term sample storage at +4 to −20 °C (39 to −4 °F) by using standard refrigerators or freezers, many molecular biology or life science laboratories need long-term cryopreservation (including "cold chain" and/or "colder chain" infrastructures) for biological samples like DNA, RNA, proteins, cell extracts, or reagents. To reduce the risk of sample damage, these types of samples need extremely low temperatures of −80 to −86 °C (−112 to −123 °F). Mammalian cells are often stored in dewars containing liquid nitrogen at −196 °C (−320.8 °F). Cryogenic chest freezers can achieve temperatures down to −150 °C (−238 °F) to −152 °C (−242 °F) and may include a liquid nitrogen backup.

Biological samples in ULT freezers are often stored in polymer tubes and microtubes, generally inside storage boxes that are commonly made of cardboard, polymer plastics or other materials. Microtubes are placed in storage boxes containing a grid of dividers that typically permit 64, 81, or 100 tubes to be stored. Standard ULT freezers can store approximately 350 to 450 microtube boxes.

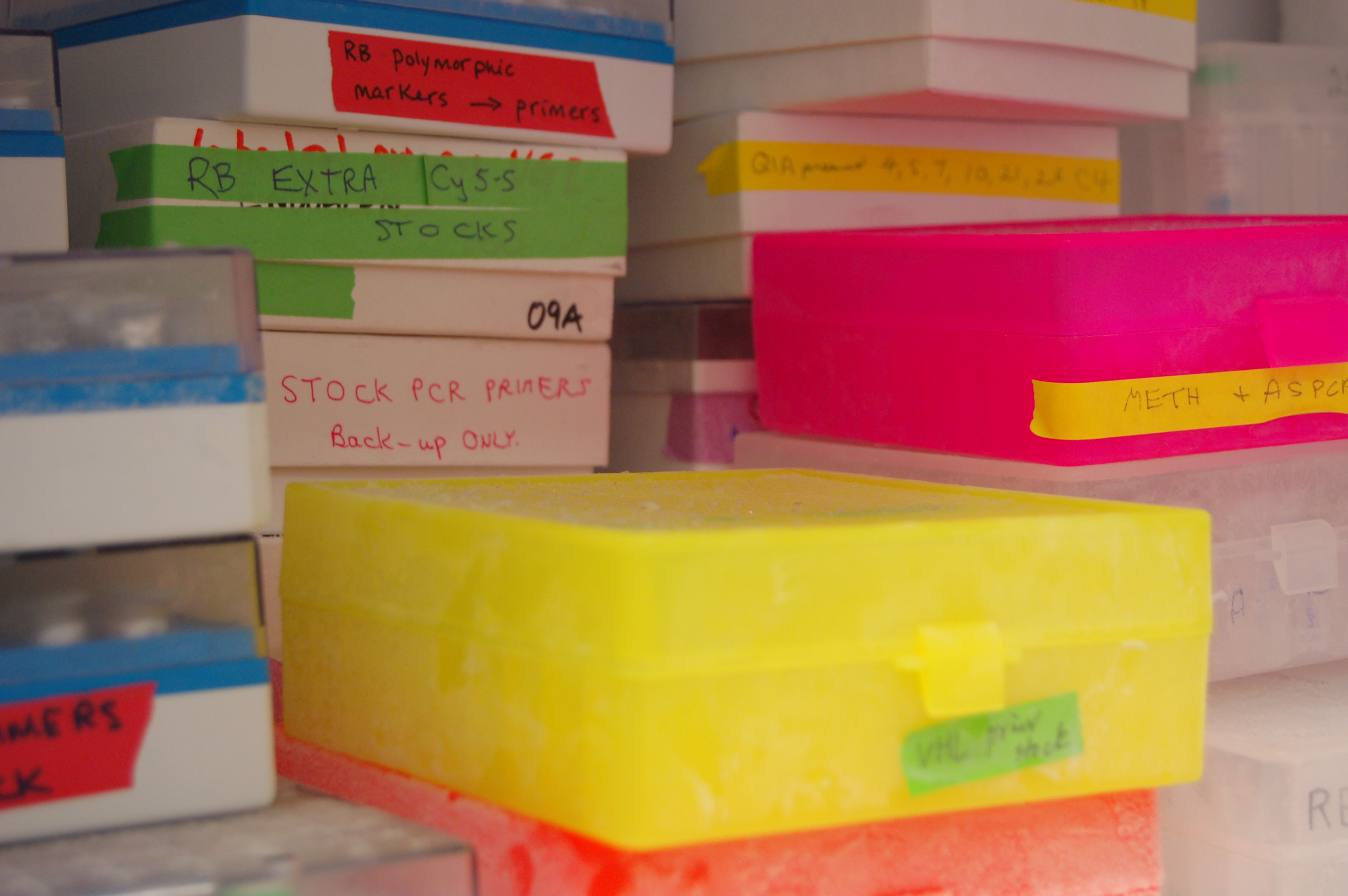
Boxes commonly used for storage of samples in laboratory freezers

ULT freezers are widely used in fish and meat preservation. The tuna fishing industry requires the use of ULT freezers.

ULT freezers are commonly fitted with alarm systems that will remotely alert designated parties in the case of a freezer failure.

== Pull down time ==
The pull down time is defined as the necessary time to cool down the ULT freezer from ambient temperatures to the selected temperature of −80 to −86 °C (−112 to −123 °F). The time strongly depends on the type of insulation, the efficiency of the compressor system as well as the installed metal shelves within the freezer. At the start of the twenty-first century, ULT freezers were able to cool down within 3 to 5 hours. Warm up time is typically 1/8 °C per minute.

== Energy consumption ==
Due to the low temperature, ULT freezers consume high amounts of electric energy and hence are expensive to operate. In 2010, Stanford University had more than 2,000 ULT freezers, which used an estimated 40 billion BTUs of energy and cost the university $5.6 million annually. Newer ULT freezers consume less energy. Nonetheless, a comprehensive report published in 2015 by the Center for Energy Efficient Laboratories (funded by Pacific Gas & Electric, Southern California Edison, and San Diego Gas & Electric utility companies as part of their Emerging Technologies program) found that laboratories in California consumed an estimated 800 GWh/year, with ULT freezers being the greatest contributor to that total.

At least as early as 2018, some scientists suggested that laboratories set freezers to –70 °C instead of –80 °C to conserve energy and decrease wear on the freezer's compressor.

Depending on the volume of the freezer, the opening frequency of the users as well as the number of samples, the energy consumption starts from ca. 11 kWh/day and higher. The US government calculates 20 kWh/day. A study performed at the University of Edinburgh showed that the New Brunswick U570 HEF model consumed slightly under 10 kWh/day. Without any data, the University of Michigan claimed that "older model" ULT devices could consume "up to 30 kWh/day". A sales pitch written in 2023 quoted "16-22 KWh of electricity per day".

To reduce the energy consumption, the insulation should be as efficient as possible. Additional inner doors reduce the loss of temperature when opening the main door. Icing within the ULT freezer should be reduced to a minimum. Modern ULT freezers employ variable speed drives for both the compressors and fans. This has reduced energy consumption a further 30% to typically 8.5 kWh/day.

== Refrigeration cycle ==
ULT freezers that employ the cascade refrigeration (CR) system use up to 20 times the energy footprint of household fridges, and used to refrigerate with greenhouse gas fluids (typically hydrofluorocarbon R-508B). Modern ULT freezers employ HC (i.e., hydrocarbon) gas mixtures: typically, ethane and propane. This technology was developed in the mid-1990s, and improved efficiency by up to 30% over the conventional CFC or HFC gassed freezers. Alternatively ULT freezers may use the Stirling cycle in reverse (A Stirling cooler) for refrigeration.

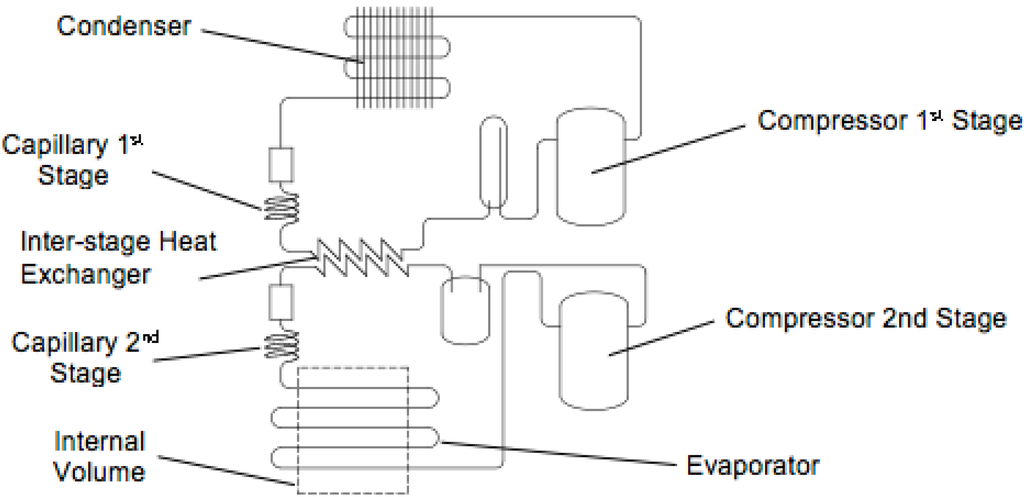
A two-cycle cascade refrigeration process schematic diagram

ULT freezers with dual cooling systems use the auto-cascade system. Dual cooling systems are used for redundancy to protect from single compressor failure.

== See also ==
- Dry ice
