= Gabbianelli =

Italian ceramics company

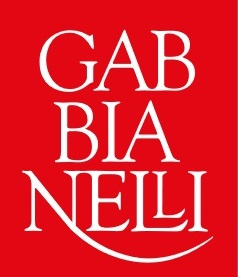
- Industry: ceramics
- Founded: 1939 in Cusano Milanino, Italy
- Founder: Enrico Gabbianelli
- Headquarters: Biella, Italy
- Area served: worldwide
- Parent: Altaeco S.p.A.
- Website: gabbianelli.com

Gabbianelli is an Italian ceramics company specializing in ceramic wall and floor tiles. It was founded in 1939 by Enrico Gabbianelli with its manufacturing plant in Cusano Milanino. During the 1960s and 70s it also produced a series of ceramic objects for the home by prominent Italian designers. The company was bought by Ceramica Bardelli in 1996, although the two companies maintained their own production and brand names. In 2000, following a further period of consolidation and restructuring in the Italian ceramics industry, Bardelli, Gabbianelli, and several other brands became subsidiaries of the Biella-based Altaeco Group.

Gio Ponti had a lengthy association with Gabbianelli while both Enzo Mari and Bruno Munari designed tiles for them in the 1970s when Gabbianelli was one of the first firms to introduce screen-printing into tile production. Gabbianelli domestic objects and tiles are held in the Museo Internazionale delle Ceramiche in Faenza, the Philadelphia Museum of Art, the Museum Boijmans Van Beuningen in Rotterdam, and the Cooper Hewitt, Smithsonian Design Museum.

== Gabbianelli designers ==
Designers who have worked for Gabbianelli include:

- Sergio Asti
- Liisi Beckmann
- Lucio Fontana
- Enzo Mari
- Marcello Morandini
- Bruno Munari
- Gaetano Pesce
- Gio Ponti
