= Bean bag chair =

1960s anatomic chair design

Sacco
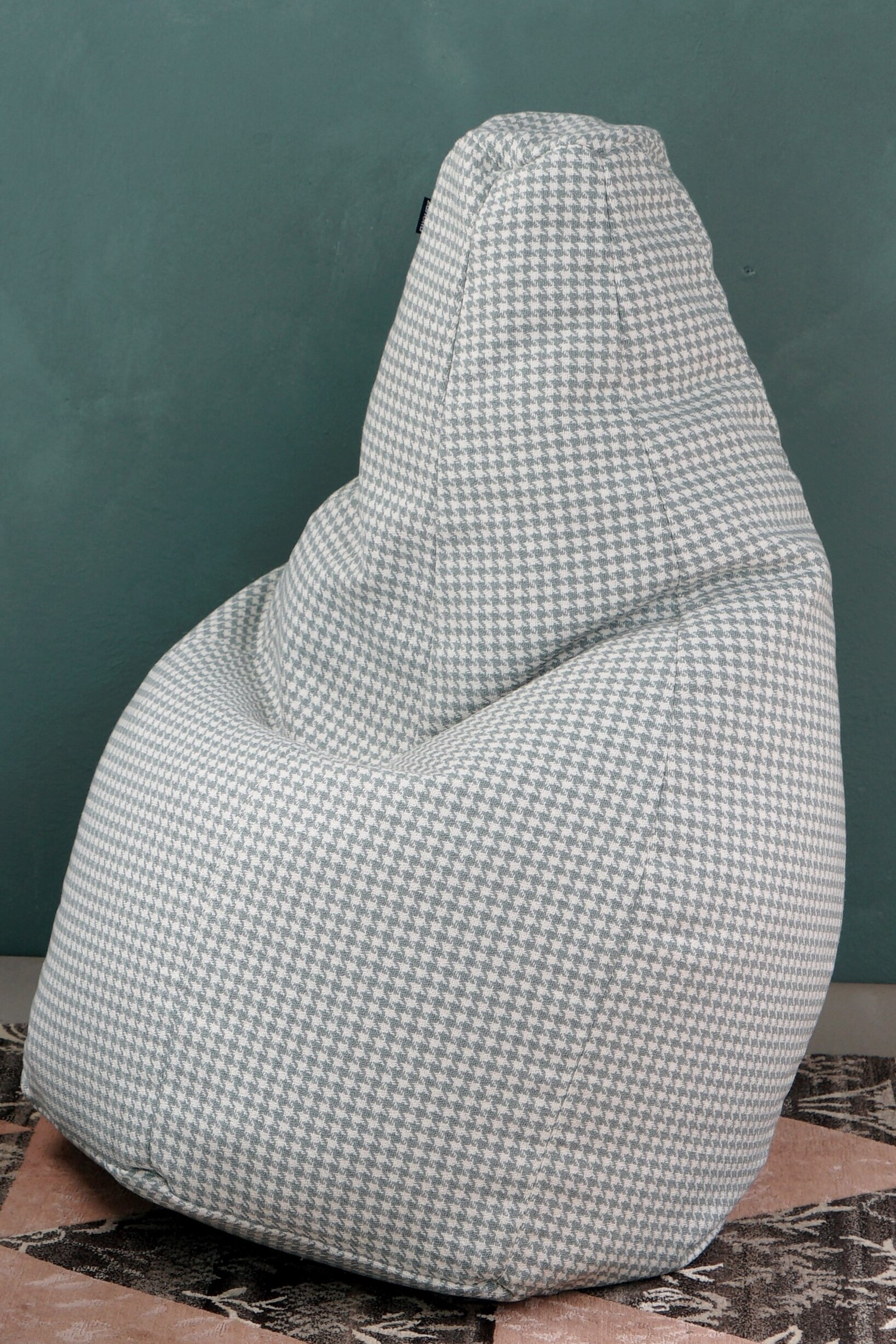
- Designer: Piero Gatti, Cesare Paolini, Franco Teodoro
- Date: 1968
- Made in: Italy
- Materials: Leather or textile (shell), expanded polystyrene (filling)
- Style / tradition: Italian Radical design
- Sold by: Zanotta S.p.A.
- Collection: ADI Design Museum, Centre Pompidou, Museum of Modern Art, Victoria and Albert Museum, et al.

A Sacco chair, also commonly known as a bean bag chair or simply a bean bag, is a chair consisting of a large, pear-shaped bag or sack (Italian: sacco) made of leather or fabric and filled with expanded polystyrene foam pellets ('beans') or a similar material. It is an example of anatomic design, as the user's body determines its form.

The original bean bag design was introduced by three Italian designers in 1968, and became "one of the icons of the Italian anti-design movement. Its complete flexibility and formlessness made it the perfect antidote to the static formalism of mainstream Italian furniture of the period," according to design historian Penny Sparke.

The Sacco chair was awarded the Compasso d'Oro and is in the collections of many museums, including the Museum of Modern Art in New York, the Musée National d'Art Moderne in Paris, the Victoria and Albert Museum in London, and the ADI Design Museum in Milan.

== History ==
Sacco was introduced in 1968 by Italian designers Piero Gatti, Cesare Paolini, and Franco Teodoro. Their work came out of the Radical period of the Italian modernist movement and was highly inspired by newly available materials and technologies. Post-war technology enabled increased production by introducing new materials, such as polystyrene. The idea of mass-produced goods at affordable prices appealed to consumers. This, in turn, created the need for a revolution in the creative and manufacturing processes.

The architect, Cesare Paolini, was born in Genoa and graduated from the Polytechnic University of Turin. Franco Teodoro and Piero Gatti, the designers, studied at the Istituto Tecnico Industriale Statale per le Arti Grafiche e Fotografiche in Turin. They established their architecture firm in Turin in 1965.

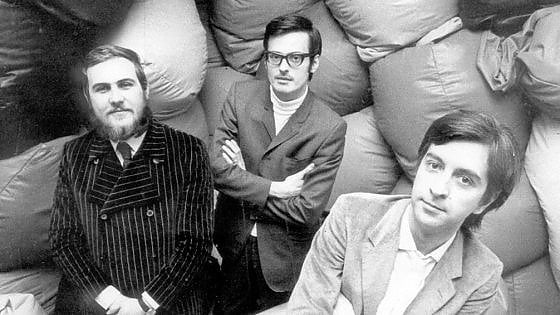
From left to right, Franco Teodoro, Cesare Paolini and Piero Gatti, creator of Sacco, in Paris in 1969

Piero Gatti, Cesare Paolini, and Franco Teodoro, inspired by their designer predecessors, developed Sacco, the "shapeless chair" in 1968. Although it was not the first amorphous chair design in Italian history, Sacco was the first successful product created in partnership with Zanotta. The product's predecessor had a significant design flaw. It was unable to sustain its form and never reached production. Sacco addressed that flaw with the use of leather for the exterior and carefully placed stitching. The use of leather was not coincidental, as it was a product of national pride in Italy at the time. The target user for the chair was the hippie community, whose nonconformist values aligned with the chair's unconventional design.

Sacco is part of the permanent collections of some of the most important museums of contemporary art worldwide, such as the Museum of Modern Art in New York City, the Centre Pompidou in Paris, and the Victoria and Albert Museum in London.

Sacco was part of the 1972 exhibition at the Museum of Modern Art in New York, Italy: The New Domestic Landscape – Achievements and Problems of Italian Design.

In 2025, the Sacco was included in Pirouette: Turning Points in Design, an exhibition at the Museum of Modern Art featuring "widely recognized design icons [...] highlighting pivotal moments in design history."

== Awards ==
The Sacco was recognised with a M.I.A. award at the 1968 Mostra Internazionale dell'Arredamento in Monza, and received the 1973 BIO 5 award at the Biennale of Design in Ljubljana.

In 2020, exactly fifty years after the design was first overlooked by the ADI jury, failing to win the 1970 award, the Sacco chair received the Compasso d'Oro Award and was added to the collection of the ADI Design Museum in Milan.

== Exhibitions ==
The bean bag chair has been prominently featured in several exhibitions, highlighting its significance in design and art history. At the Museum of Modern Art, New York, it was included in the Recent Acquisitions: Design Collection exhibition from 1 December 1970 to 31 January 1971, and later in Italy: The New Domestic Landscape, held from 26 May to 11 September 1972. It also appeared at the Solomon R. Guggenheim Museum in The Italian Metamorphosis, 1943–1968, from 7 October 1994 to 22 January 1995, and subsequently traveled to the Triennale di Milano (February–May 1995) and the Kunstmuseum Wolfsburg (May–September 1995).

The Museum of Modern Art, New York, revisited the bean bag chair in its Architecture and Design: Inaugural Installation, displayed from 20 November 2004 to 7 November 2005. More recently, it was featured at the Kanal–Centre Pompidou in Brussels as part of the Phantom Offices exhibition, held from 23 January to 30 June 2019. In September 2019, the Cité de l'Architecture et du Patrimoine in Paris included the bean bag chair in Architects' Furniture: 1960–2020. Lastly, it appeared in the Déjà-vu. Le design dans notre quotidien exhibition at the Musée d'Art Moderne et Contemporain in Saint-Priest-en-Jarez, which ran from 15 December 2020 to 22 August 2021.

=== Collections ===
- ADI Design Museum, Milan
- Brücke-Museum, Berlin
- Centro Arte e Design, Calenzano
- Dallas Museum of Art, Dallas
- Denver Art Museum, Denver
- Fondazione Triennale Design Museum, Milan
- Fonds Régional d'Art Contemporain, Dunkerque
- Israel Museum, Jerusalem
- Kunstgewerbemuseum, Berlin
- Kunstmuseum, Düsseldorf
- Musée d'Art Moderne et Contemporain de Saint-Étienne, Auvergne-Rhône-Alpes
- Musée des Arts Décoratifs, Paris
- Musée National d'Art Moderne (Centre Pompidou), Paris
- Museo dell'arredo contemporaneo, Russi (Ra)
- Museo Omero, Ancona, Italy
- Museum für angewandte Kunst, Vienna
- Museum für Kunst und Gewerbe, Hamburg
- Museum of Applied Arts, Leipzig
- Museum of Modern Art, New York
- Museum voor Sierkunst en Vormgeving, Gent
- National Gallery of Victoria, Melbourne
- Philadelphia Museum of Art, Philadelphia
- Powerhouse Museum (MAAS), Sydney
- Saint Louis Art Museum, Missouri
- Shiodome Italia Creative Center, Tokyo
- Taideteollisuusmuseo Konstindustrimuseet, Helsinki
- Tel Aviv Museum of Art, Tel Aviv
- Thessaloniki Design Museum, Thessaloniki
- Uměleckoprůmyslové Muzeum, Prague
- Victoria and Albert Museum, London
- Vitra Design Museum, Weil am Rhein

== In popular culture ==
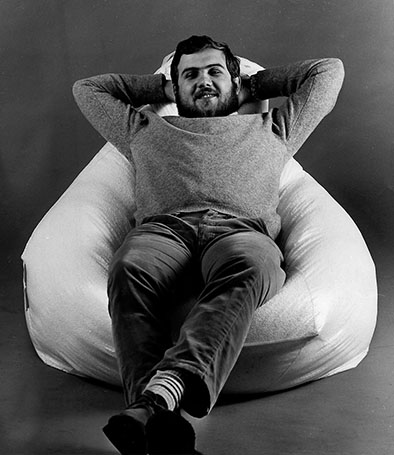
Franco Teodoro reclining comfortably on a Sacco chair

Sacco often appears in the Peanuts comic strips of Charles M. Schulz. The Italian actor Paolo Villaggio uses the Sacco as a comedy sight gag in the 1981 Italian comedy Fracchia la belva umana by Neri Parenti. Other companies and designers have created products, DIY kits, and homemade versions inspired by the original Sacco.

== Bibliography ==
- Paola Antonelli (Museum of Modern Art | MOMA), Sacco Chair | Object Lesson
- Ingrid Halland, The unstable object: Glifo, Blow, Sacco at MoMA, 1972, Journal of Design History, Volume 33, Issue 4, December 2020, Pages 329–345, Oxford University Press, https://doi.org/10.1093/jdh/epz051
- Cindi Strauss, Germano Celant, J. Taylor Kubala, Radical – Italian Design 1965–1985 – The Dennis Freedman Collection, Yale University Press, 2020
- Mel Byars, The Design Encyclopedia, New York, John Wiley & Sons, Inc., 1994
- Emilio Ambasz [a cura di], Italy: The New Domestic Landscape – Achievements and Problems of Italian Design, New York, Museum Of Modern Art, 1972
- Margaret Timmers, The Way We Live Now: Designs for Interiors 1950 to the Present Day, Victoria and Albert Museum, 1978
- Grace Lees-Maffei, Kjetil Fallan [editors], Made in Italy Rethinking a Century of Italian Design, London, Bloomsbury Academic, 2014
- Paola Antonelli, Matilda McQuaid, Objects of Design from the Museum of Modern Art, Museum of Modern Art (New York, N.Y.), 2003
- Bernhard E. Bürdek, Design Storia, Teoria e Pratica del Design del Prodotto, Roma, Gangemi Editore, 2008
- Victoria and Albert Museum. Circulation Department, Whitechapel Art Gallery, Modern Chairs 1918–1970, London: Lund Humphries. 1971
- Victor Papanek, Design for the Real World, New York: 1974
- Moderne Klassiker, Mobel, die Geschichte machen, Hamburg, 1982
- Kathryn B. Hiesinger and George H. Marcus III (eds.), Design Since 1945, Philadelphia, Philadelphia Museum of Art, 1983
- Fifty Chairs that Changed the World: Design Museum Fifty, London's Design Museum, London, ISBN 978-1-84091-540-2
- Charlotte Fiell, Peter Fiell, Plastic dreams: synthetic visions in design, Carlton Books Ltd, 2010, ISBN 978-1-906863-08-1
- Anne Bony, Design: History, Main Trends, Major Figures, Larousse/Chambers, 2005
- Bernd Polster, Claudia Newman, Markus Schuler, The A–Z of Modern Design, Merrell Publishers Ltd, 2009, ISBN 978-1-85894-502-6
- Domitilla Dardi, Il design in cento oggetti, Federico Motta Editore, Milano, 2008, ISBN 978-88-7179-586-7
- Anty Pansera, Il Design del mobile italiano dal 1946 a oggi, Laterza, 1990
- Charles Boyce, Joseph T. Butler, Dictionary of Furniture, Simon and Schuster, New York, 2014, ISBN 978-1-62873-840-7
- Michael Tambini, The Look of the Century, DK Pub., 1999, ISBN 978-0-7894-4635-0
- AA.VV., 100 objects of Italian design La Triennale di Milano: Permanent Collection of Italian Design, The Milan Triennale, Gangemi Editore
- Germano Celant [ed.], preface by Umberto Eco,The Italian Metamorphosis, 1943–1968, Guggenheim Museum Publications, New York, 1994, ISBN 0-8109-6871-1
- Fiorella Bulegato, Elena Dellapiana, Il design degli architetti italiani 1920–2000, Mondadori Electa, 2014, ISBN 978-88-370-9562-8
