= Svobodnoye, Leningrad Oblast =

Rural locality in Vyborgsky District, Russia

Coordinates: 61°4′58.8″N 29°18′0″E

Svobodnoye (Russian: Свобо́дное; Finnish: Kirvu) is a rural locality on Karelian Isthmus, in Vyborgsky District, Leningrad Oblast in Russia. Until the Winter War and Continuation War, it was the administrative center of the Kirvu municipality of the Viipuri province of Finland.

It is the birthplace of Juho Niukkanen (1888–1954) and Liisi Beckmann (1924–2004).
