= Jacob Fussell =

American manufacturer (1819–1912)

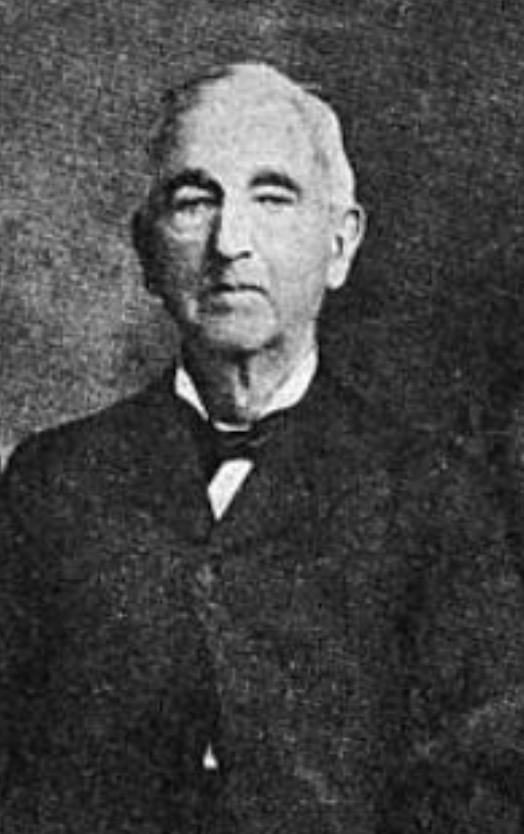
- Fussell in 1905 publication
- Born: C. Jacob Fussell; February 24, 1819 near Fallston, Harford County, Maryland, U.S.
- Died: April 10, 1912 (aged 93); Washington, D.C., U.S.
- Resting place: Oak Hill Cemetery; Washington, D.C., U.S.
- Occupation: Manufacturer
- Political party: Republican

C. Jacob Fussell (February 24, 1819 – April 10, 1912) was an American manufacturer of ice cream who was known as the first person to commercially distribute ice cream in the United States.

== Early life ==
C. Jacob Fussell was born on February 24, 1819, in Little Falls, near Fallston, Harford County, Maryland. He was from a Quaker family and descended from Solomon Fussell, who emigrated to America from Yorkshire, England. He apprenticed with a stove fitter as a teenager.

== Career ==
Fussell failed to establish a stove business. He then operated a dairy business for a Quaker. In 1851, Fussell sold dairy products from farms in York County, Pennsylvania, via milk routes in Baltimore. Fussell also sold cream to customers, but found the demand to be unpredictable. In the winter of 1851–52, Fussell started to use the excess cream to manufacture ice cream in Seven Valleys, Pennsylvania, and ship it via train to Baltimore. After two years, Fussell abandoned his ice cream manufacturing operation in Seven Valleys and moved it to Baltimore. He built a factory at the intersection of Hillen and Exeter streets in Baltimore. A Seven Valleys resident, Daniel Henry, would operate the factory in Seven Valleys after he left.

In 1856, Fussell served as a secretary at the 1856 Republican National Convention in Philadelphia.

In 1856, Fussell opened a factory in Washington, D.C. During the Civil War, the United States Army offered to purchase his operation, but he refused. He expanded to Boston in 1862 and opened a shop on Park Street. He expanded again to New York City and opened a shop at 299 Fourth Avenue on February 3, 1864. In 1870, Fussell added three partners to his business in New York City, Stephen Dunnington, Nathaniel V. Woodhill and James Madison Horton. The business operated as Jacob Fussell and Company and sold ice cream for US$1.00 per gallon to hotels and US$1.25 per gallon for orders of smaller quantities. Horton bought out the other partners and would rename the company as J. M. Horton Ice Cream Company. By 1909, Fussell's factory would produce 30,000 million gallons of ice cream per year. Fussell befriended and taught Perry Brazelton of Mount Pleasant, Iowa, how to make ice cream.

Fussell was an abolitionist and was involved in the Underground Railroad. After the Civil War, Fussell financed a housing development for African Americans called Fussell Court.

== Personal life ==
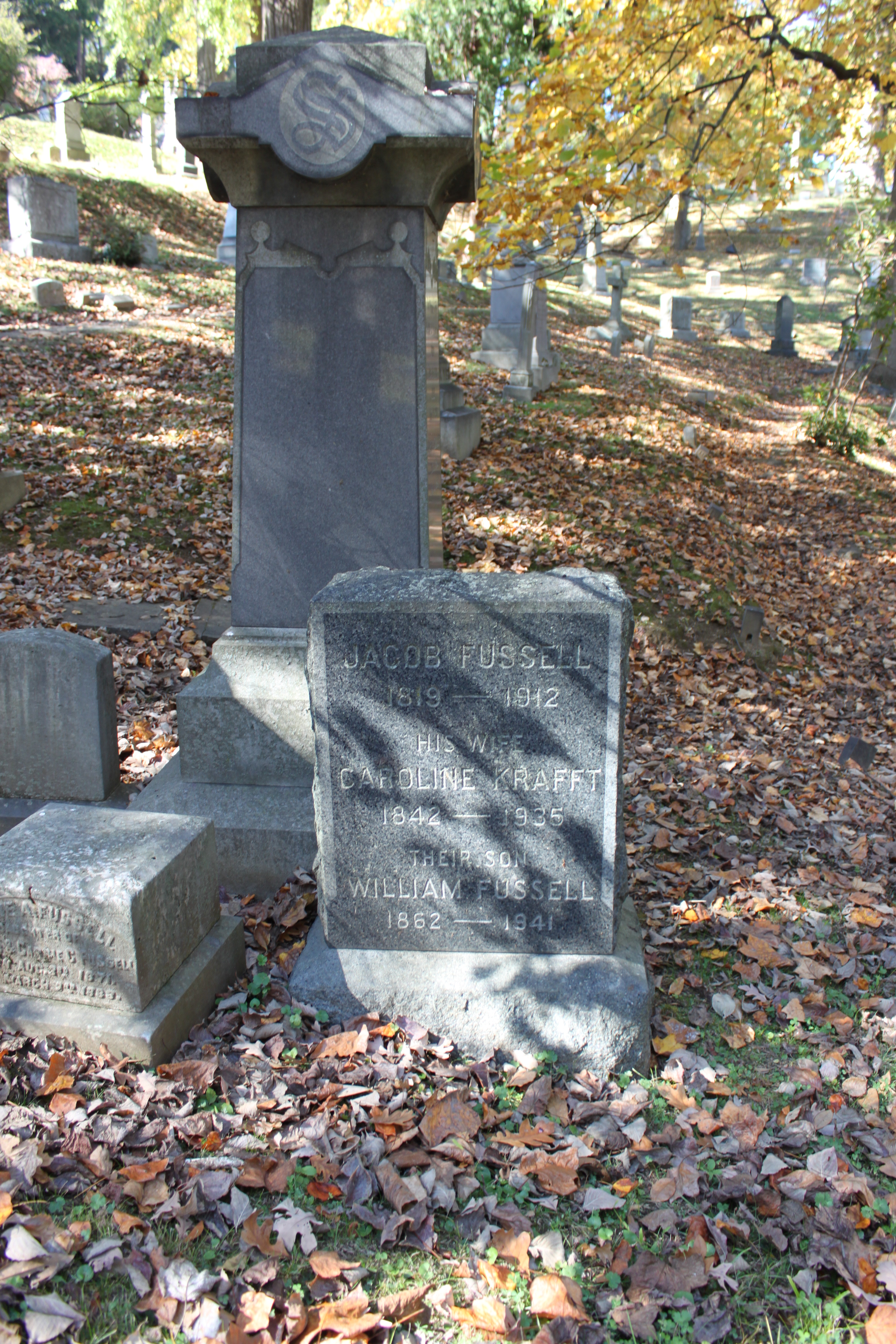
Grave of Fussell at Oak Hill Cemetery

Fussell lived at 28th Street in New York City. After selling his business to Horton, Fussell moved back to Washington, D.C., where he lived until his death.

Fussell married twice. His second wife did not move with him from New York to Washington, D.C.; however, they did not legally separate. His children included Mordecai T. Fussell, Jacob Jr., Norris, Frank, William and Carrie.

Fussell died on April 10, 1912, at his home at 1457 14th Street NW in Washington, D.C. He was buried at Oak Hill Cemetery.

== Legacy ==
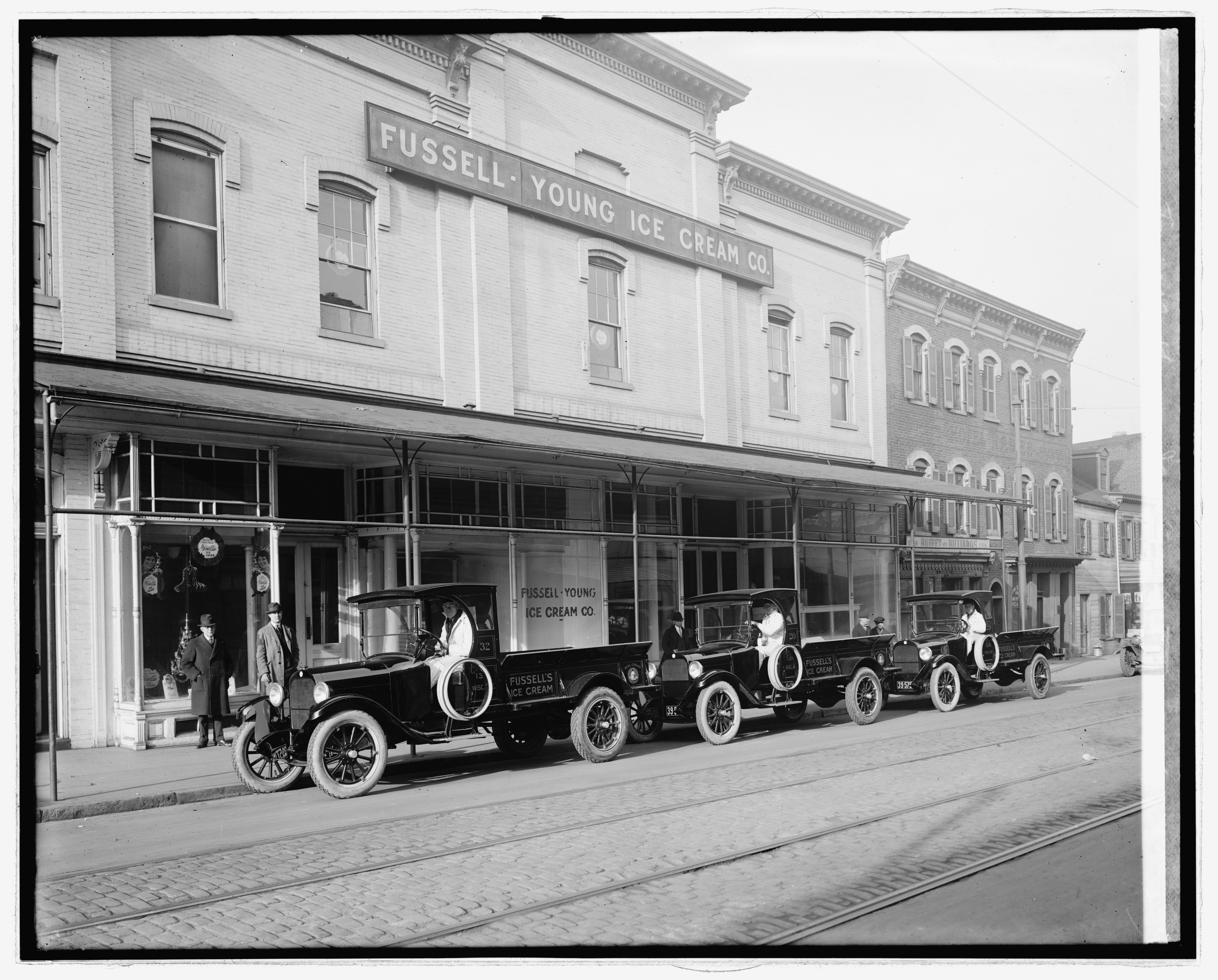
Fussell-Young Ice Cream Company (c. 1921–1922)

In 2012, a historical marker was dedicated to commemorate that Fussell was the first person to commercially distribute ice cream in the United States. He was also known as the "Father of the Ice Cream Industry".
