= Zanotta (company) =

Italian furniture company

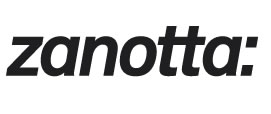
- Company type: S.p.A.
- Industry: furniture
- Founded: 1954
- Founder: Aurelio Zanotta
- Headquarters: Nova Milanese, Italy
- Area served: worldwide
- Website: zanotta.it

Zanotta is an Italian furniture company particularly known for the iconic pieces of Italian design it produced in the 1960s, 70s, and 80s. These include the "Sacco" bean bag chair and "Blow", the first mass-produced inflatable chair. The company was founded in 1954 and has its main plant in Nova Milanese. In 1984 Zanotta established its experimental division, Zabro, headed by Alessandro Guerriero, with Alessandro Mendini and Stefano Casciani. Since the death of its founder, Aurelio Zanotta, in 1991, it has been run by members of his family. Zanotta's products were awarded the Compasso d'Oro in 1967, 1979, 1987 and 2020.

== History ==
The company was founded in 1954 by the young entrepreneur Aurelio Zanotta with its manufacturing plant in Nova Milanese where it remains to the present day. Originally called Zanotta Poltrona, at first it specialised in fairly traditional upholstered furniture. However, by the early 1960s, the company had established a reputation for modern design and began commissioning avant-garde works by designers such as Achille and Pier Giacomo Castiglioni, Gae Aulenti, Ettore Sottsass, Alessandro Mendini and Piero Gatti-Cesare Paolini-Franco Teodoro.

In 1965 Zanotta was one of the first furniture companies to use expanded polyurethane foam and frameless construction in its designs, most notably the "Throw Away" series of sofas and armchairs designed by Willie Landels. (Note: Willie Landels (born 1928) is an Italian-born painter and designer. He was also the editor of Harpers & Queen magazine from the late 1960s to 1989.) One of Zanotta's most enduring successes was its 1968 "Sacco" bean bag chair, designed by Piero Gatti, Cesare Paolini and Franco Teodoro. Sacco has been awarded the XXVI Premio Compasso d'Oro in 2020. and it is exhibited in 26 museums of modern art all over the world, among them the Museum of Modern Art in New York, the Victoria and Albert Museum in London and the Musée des Arts Decoratifs in Paris. It was originally to have used polyurethane foam off-cuts for the filling but eventually settled on polystyrene beads. From the 1970s Zanotta achieved further success by re-issuing earlier designs which in their day had been considered too avant-garde for mass production. These included the "Larianna" tubular steel chair designed by Giuseppe Terragni in 1936 and the "Mezzadro" stool designed by Achille and Pier Giacomo Castiglioni in the late 1950s.

Zanotta established Zabro, its experimental division, in 1983 headed by Alessandro Mendini and Alessandro Guerriero. (Note: Alessandro Guerriero (born 1943) is an Italian architect and designer. He is the founder of the radical Italian design group Studio Alchimia.) Amongst the pieces Zabro produced were Mendini's "Dorifora" chair in 1984 and the furniture series "Animali Domestici" (Domestic Animals) designed by Andrea Branzi in 1986. The company launched Zanotta Edizioni coordinated by Stefano Casciani in 1989, "a special collection exploring the boundaries between art and design." The pieces were produced in limited editions and combined industrial manufacture with hand-painted decoration.

In 1989, Aurelio Zanotta and several of his designers including Achille Castiglioni, Gae Aulenti, Andrea Branzi, and Ettore Sottsass attended the International Design Conference in Aspen. The conference theme that year was The Italian Manifesto. In his talk at the conference Zanotta described the emergence of the mid-20-century revolution in Italian design and the early years of his own business:

Those were years of great vitality, there was an explosion of constructive energy, a profound desire to sweep away the past and create a new world. The phenomenon of Italian design grew out of this widely felt urge to renew everything.

After Aurelio Zanotta's death in 1991, the company remained in his family. Since 2002 it has been run by Zanotta's three children, Eleonora, Francesca, and Martino. The Italian furniture company Tecno purchased 80% of Zanotta's shares in 2017. However, the two companies maintain separate production, design and management structures.

== Notable designs ==
Notable designs produced by Zanotta include:

- "Lariana" chair (1936) originally designed by Giuseppe Terragni for the Casa del Fascio. The chair, made from tubular stainless steel with a wooden back and seat, was reissued by Zanotta in 1971 and remained in production until 1995. (Note: For a detailed description of Terragni's chairs and their design rationale see: Rifkind, David (June 2006). "Furnishing the Fascist interior: Giuseppe Terragni, Mario Radice and the Casa del Fascio". arq: Architectural Research Quarterly, Vol. 10, No. 2, pp. 157-170)
- "Mezzadro" stool (1957) designed by Achille and Pier Giacomo Castiglioni. It was one of three prototypes for stools using found objects which were developed by the Castiglioni brothers in the late 1950s. The "Mezzadro" uses a sheet metal seat cast from that of a 1935 Italian tractor which is balanced on stainless-steel bow and a wooden crosspiece. Zanotta began manufacturing it in 1971 and gave it the name "Mezzadro" which means "sharecropper", an allusion to the agricultural associations of its seat. Examples are held in the Museum of Modern Art and the Vitra Design Museum.
- "Throw Away" armchair and sofa (1965) designed by Willie Landels in expanded polyurethane foam using a completely frameless structure. Aurelio Zanotta first encountered Landels's pieces while on a trip to London in 1965 and immediately put the chair into production. Sofa versions were produced from 1966 and would later appear in the sets for Space: 1999. Initially, the pieces had washable vinyl covers in bright colors: red, yellow, green, light and dark blue. Later versions were also produced with fabric or leather covers.
- "Karelia" easy chair (1966) designed by Liisi Beckmann in undulating forms of expanded polyurethane foam. It was reissued by Zanotta in 2007 and exhibited at Milan's Triennale Design Museum in 2016.
- "Guscio" sleeping hut (1966) designed by Roberto Menghi in prefabricated fiberglass panels with a larch wood floor. The dome-shaped huts can sleep 2–4 people and can be assembled and disassembled at will. "Guscio" won a Compasso d'Oro in 1967.
- "Blow" inflatable armchair in PVC (1967) designed by Jonathan De Pas, Donato D'Urbino, Carla Scolari, and Paolo Lomazzi. It was the first mass-produced inflatable chair. Examples are held in the Museum of Modern Art and the Victoria and Albert Museum.
- "Sacco" chair (1968) designed by Piero Gatti, Cesare Paolini, and Franco Teodoro. Covered in leather or cloth and filled with polystyrene beads, it was the progenitor of the bean bag chair and is still in production today. Even before the design had been completely finalized, the American department store chain Macy's placed an order for 10,000 chairs. Examples of "Sacco" are held in numerous museums including the Design Museum in London and the Museum of Modern Art in New York. Sacco won a Compasso d'Oro in 2020.
- "Gaetano" table (1973) designed by Gae Aulenti. Its plate glass top rests on two removable trestles of lacquered aluminum alloy. It was shown at the Kölnisches Stadtmuseum in the 1980 exhibition Italian Furniture Design: Culture and Technology in Italian Furniture 1950-1980. "Gaetano" was one of the numerous pieces of furniture which Aulenti designed for Zanotta between 1963 and 1986.
- "Sciangai" coat rack (1973) designed by Jonathan De Pas, Donato D'Urbino, and Paolo Lomazzi. The collapsible rack is inspired by the Italian game Sciangai, a form of pick-up sticks. It won a Compasso d'Oro in 1979 and was exhibited at the Milan Triennial in 2012.
- "Cetonia" chest of drawers (1984) designed by Alessandro Mendini. One of a series of pieces produced by Zanotta's Zabro division, it is made of lacquered wood with hand-painted decoration. An example is in the permanent collection of the Indianapolis Museum of Art.
- "Papilio" coffee table (1985) designed by Alessandro Mendini. It consists of two or three levels of plate glass in undulating shapes resting on spindle legs of burnished steel. An example is held in the Kunstgewerbemuseum Berlin.
- "Tonietta" chair (1985) designed by Enzo Mari in die-cast aluminum and leather. It won a Compasso d'Oro in 1987, and an example is held in the Museum of Modern Art.
- "Animali Domestici" furniture series (1985–1986) designed by Andrea Branzi and consisting of tables, chairs, and benches produced by Zanotta's Zabro division in limited editions. The pieces combined lacquered wood with tree branches and rough wooden slats and sticks. One of the chairs is held in the Vitra Design Museum.
- "Soft" chaise longue (1999) designed by Werner Aisslinger, one of the first examples of mass-produced furniture using TechnoGel as visible upholstery. Examples are held in the Metropolitan Museum of Art and France's Centre national des arts plastiques.
- "Veryround Chair" lounge chair (2006) designed by Louise Campbell. Itself circular in shape, the chair is constructed from 260 identical circular modules in different sizes all made from laser-cut steel. It has no legs and no identifiable seat or back. An example is held by the Museum of Modern Art and was shown in the museum's 2013 exhibition Applied Design.

== Gallery ==
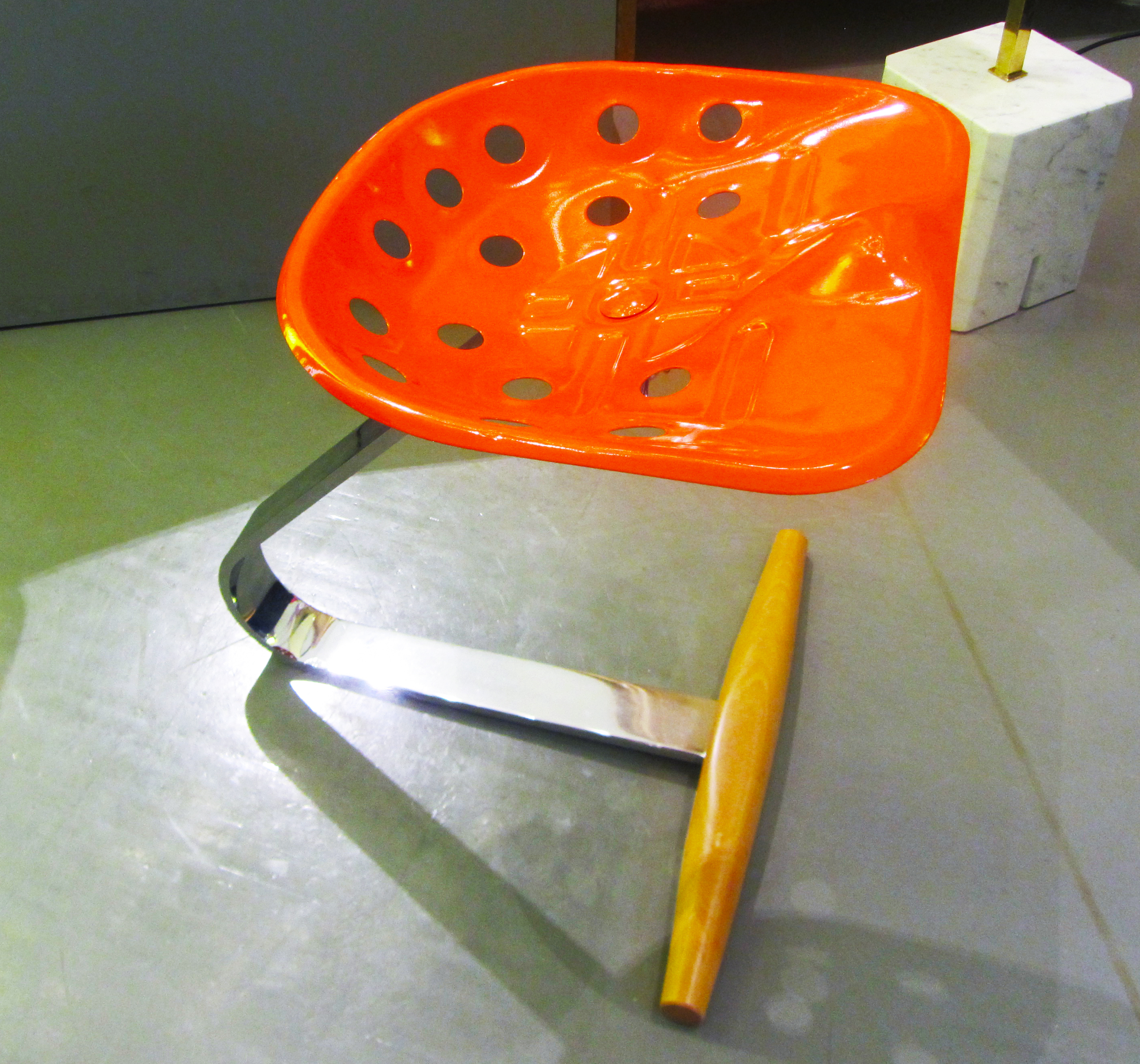
"Mezzadro" stool designed by Achille and Pier Giacomo Castiglioni (1957)

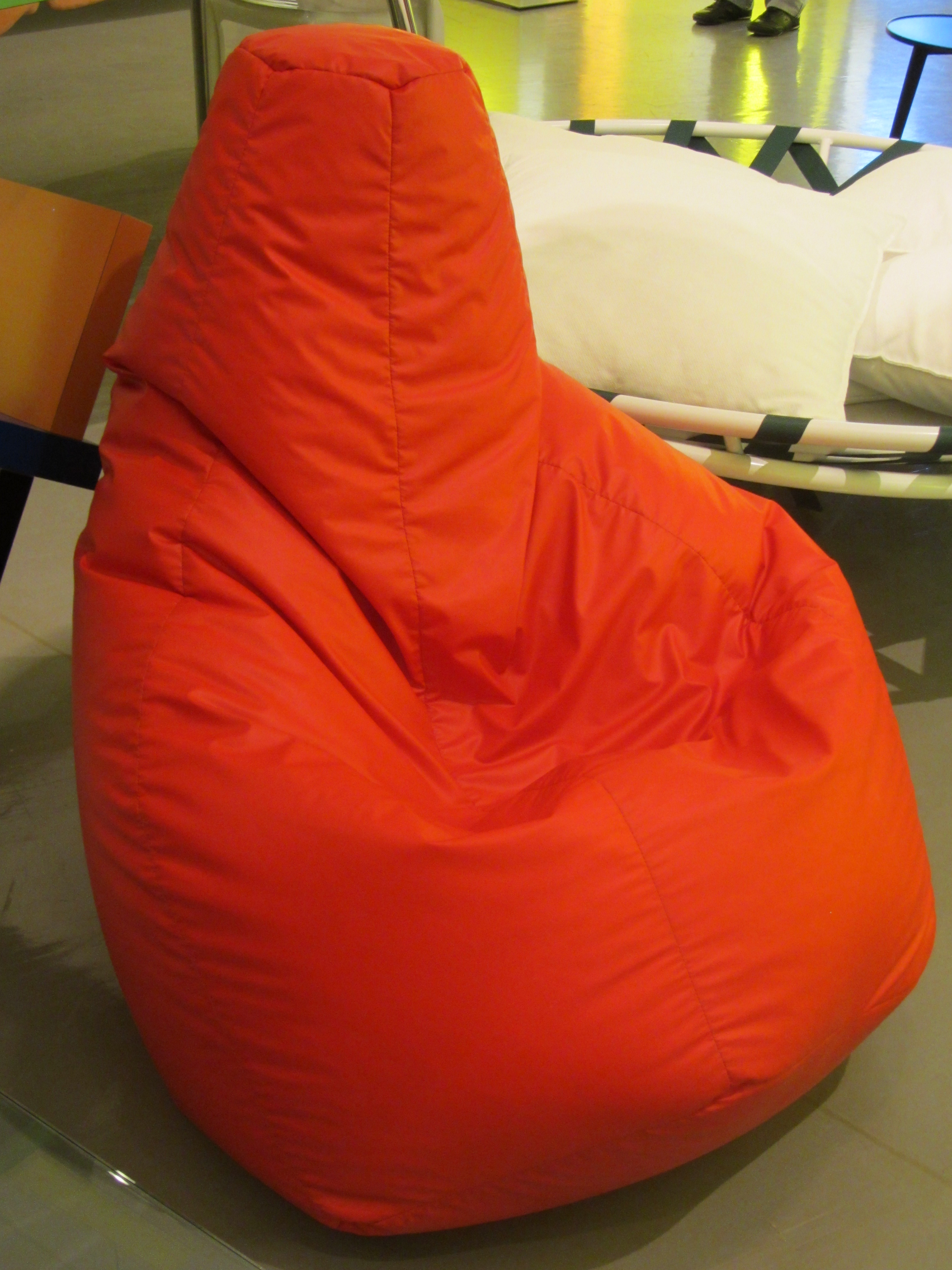
"Sacco" chair designed by Piero Gatti, Cesare Paolini, and Franco Teodoro (1968)

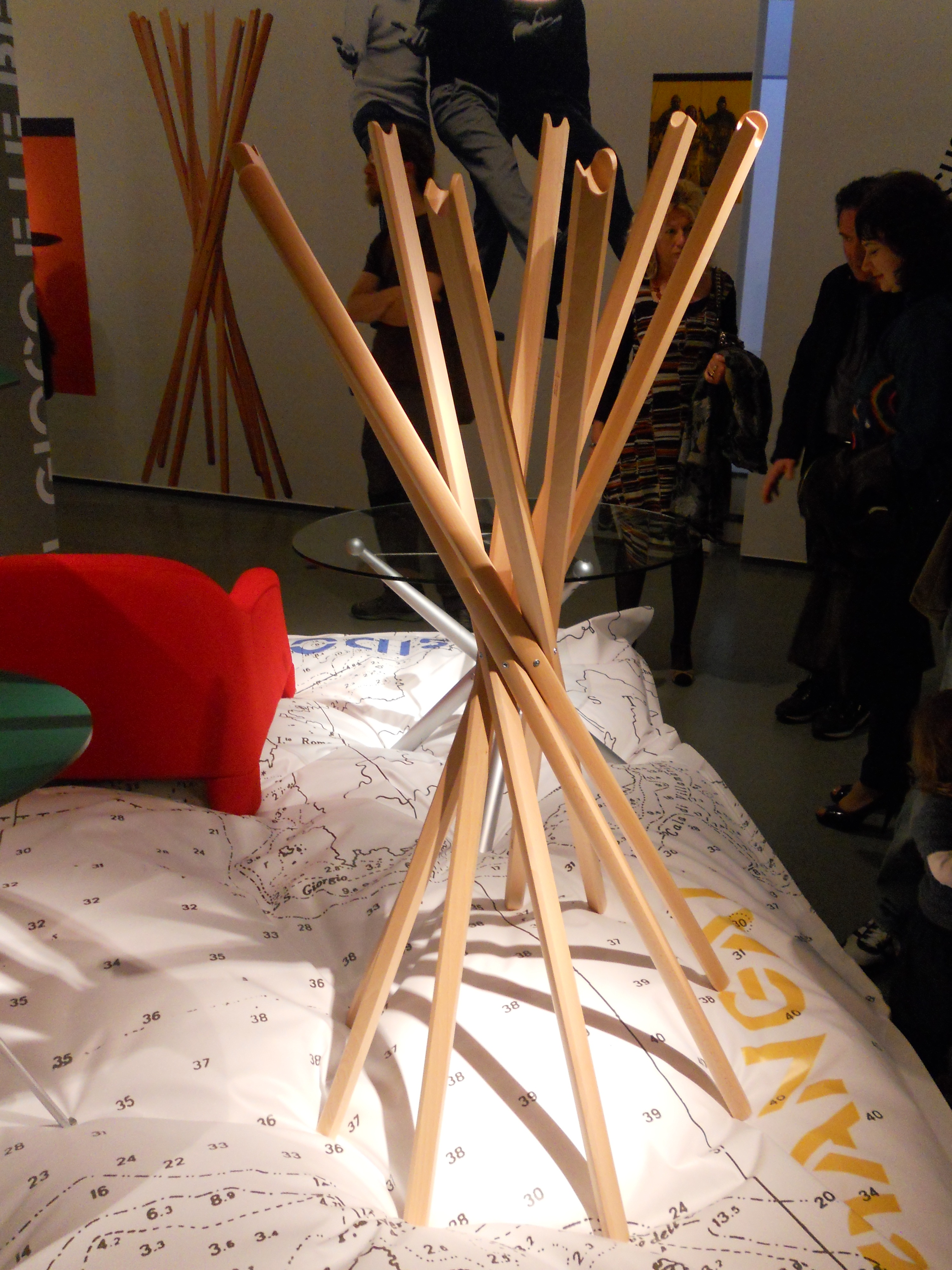
"Sciangai" coat rack designed by Jonathan De Pas, Donato D'Urbino, and Paolo Lomazzi (1973)

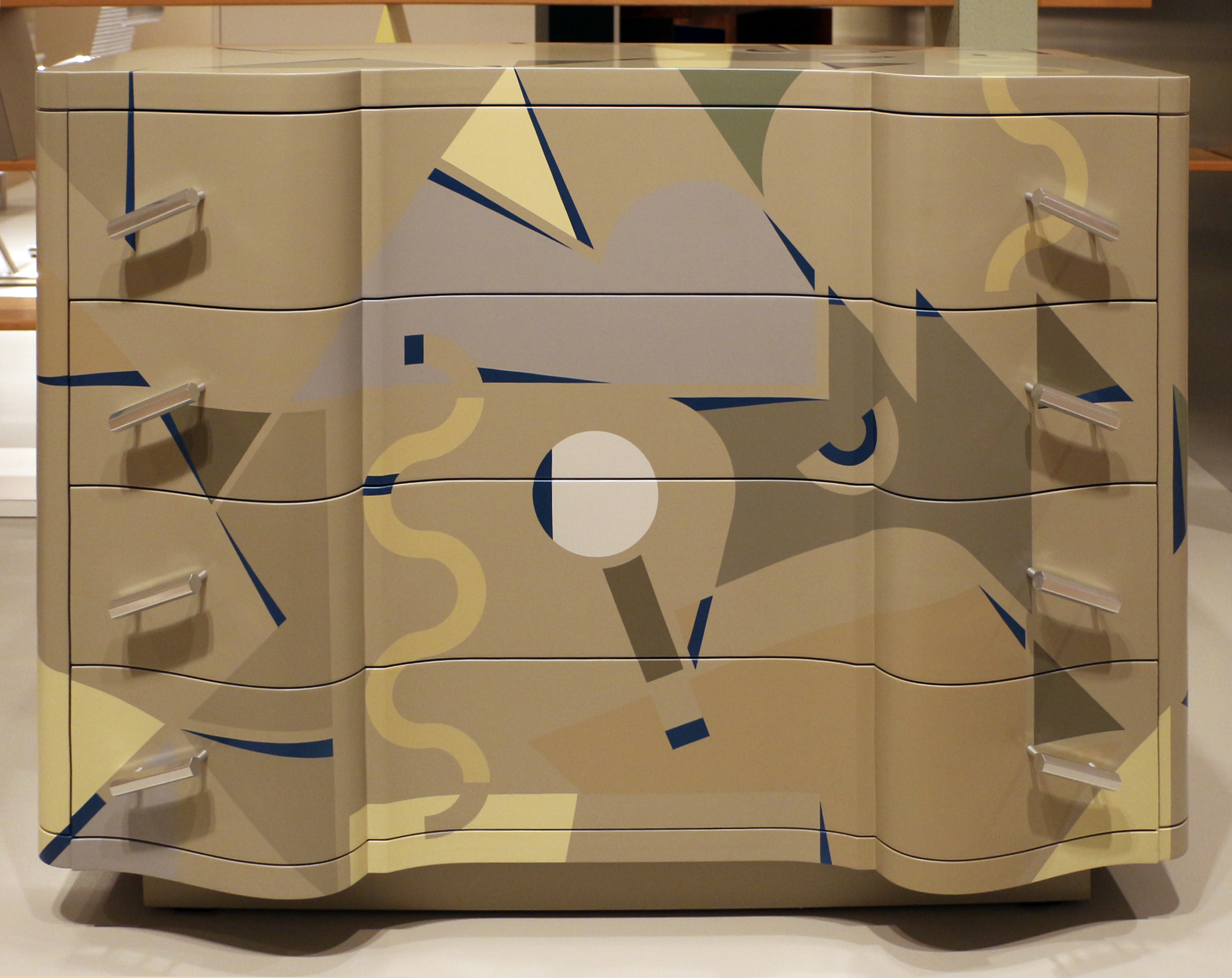
"Cetonia" chest of drawers designed by Alessandro Mendini (1984)
