= Continuous freezers =

Type of freezer used in food production

Continuous freezers are industrial freezers that continuously produce endless ice cream or frozen dessert without interruption and are used in food production.

== Background ==
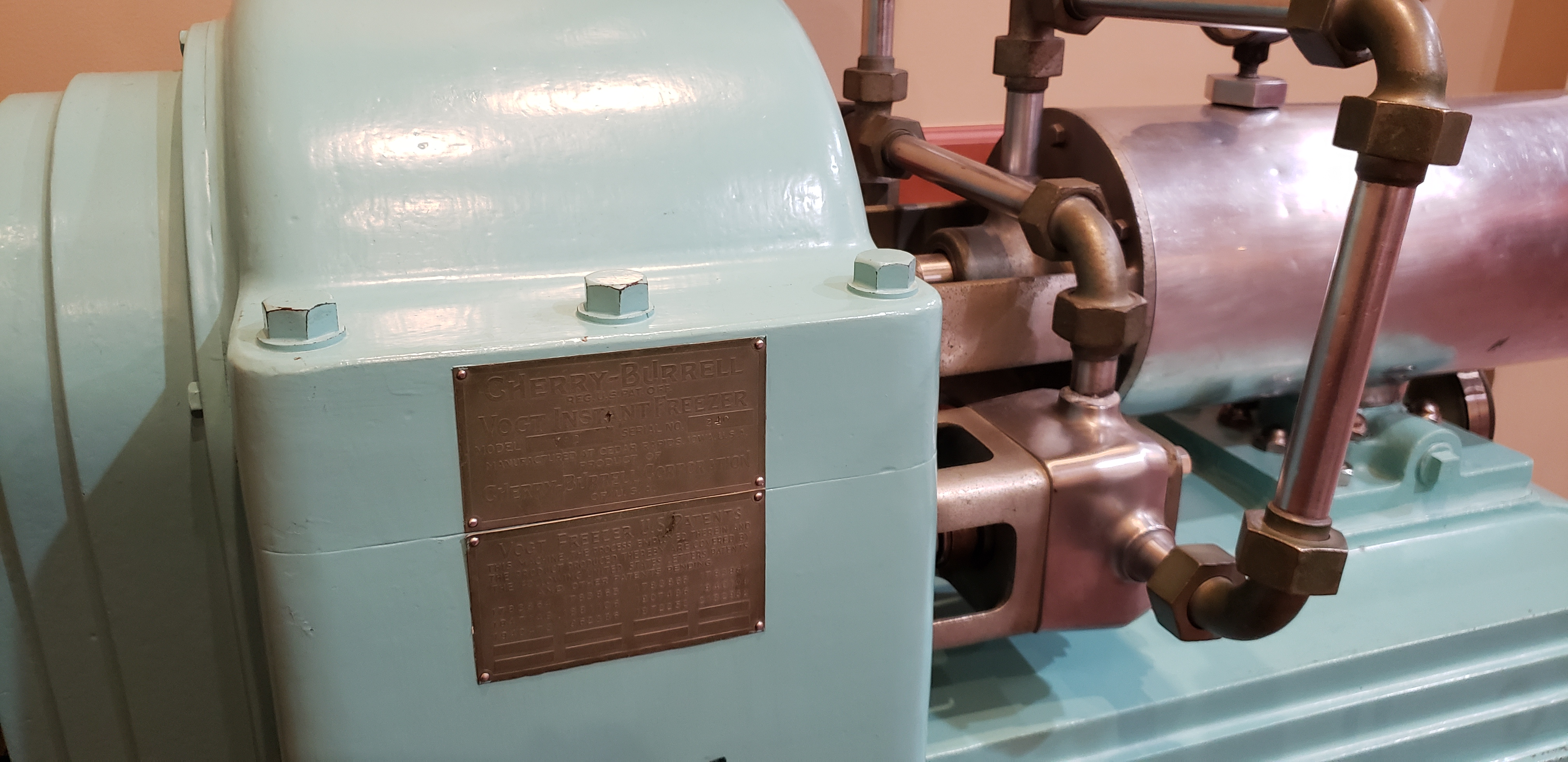
Cherry Burrell Corporation Vogt Instant Freezer

Continuous freezers offer high-volume production of milk and frozen desserts, which is often automated. Invented by Clarence Vogt, in 1926 they reduced labor, utility costs and increased production volume.

By scraping frozen mix from the inside of a drum and pumping air into the mix as it freezes, a continuous freezer improves heat transfer and allows for higher volumes of air in the mix. This process produces a continuous stream of ice cream or dessert and allows accurate control.

Continuous freezers may be connected to an ingredient feeder or fruit feeder which allows controlled inclusion of fruit and other ingredients into the mix prior to freezing.

Continuous ice cream brands include Matrix, Gram Equipment, ROKK, Technogel, Tekno-Ice, WCB, Soren, Tetra Pak, Gelmark, Tecnofreeze, Catta 27 and Technohoy.
