= Technogel =

Technogel Italia S.r.l. is a manufacturing company based in Vicenza, Italy. It makes cushioning products based on a proprietary gel.

== History ==
Technogel dates back to 1990 in Italy, when Massimo Losio--also an executive of Selle Royal Group--founded Royal Medica to use the patented gel material to relieve the discomfort of individuals bound to wheelchairs and hospital beds. By the mid-90s, Royal Medica had expanded into office furniture, providing applications of Technogel for seat cushions, armrests & ergonomic desk accessories. In 1998, Royal Medica formed a joint venture with Otto Bock. The partnership took the namesake of the material and gave rise to the company now known as Technogel.

Partnerships have included furniture and fashion houses such as Vitra, Saporiti, Steelcase, Humanscale, and Prada, to name a few. Special projects have also been produced with designers and artists such as Philippe Starck and Mariko Mori.

Technogel is a multinational corporation with primary manufacturing operations in Italy and Germany and an administrative headquarters in the United States in Pittsburgh. Established in 2010, Technogel’s US branch focuses on the development and sales of Technogel Sleeping products, as well as new innovations.

== The material ==
Initially developed and patented by Bayer Material Science, and now licensed exclusively by the Technogel company, Technogel is a polyurethane gel made without plasticizer oils.

== Consumer goods ==
Technogel launched its first line of consumer products in 2008 as the Technogel Sleeping brand of gel mattresses and pillows. The Technogel Sleeping collection is sold through various licensees and retailers in more than 50 countries.

In 2013, the Technogel Sleeping VIVE line of luxury gel mattresses and pillows and the Technogel Living seating supports collection were both launched. And the company continues research and development and new product releases. The latest update in the use of the logo removed the add-on sleeping. So only Technogel is being used.
