= Harman (surname) =

- Language: Germanic

Origin
- Region of origin: Germanic

Harman is a surname of Germanic origin. In English, Dutch, and Czech, the name is derived from Germanic given names like Hermann, Hariman, and Heremon, and combines elements meaning 'army' (heri or hari) and 'man' (man).

== List of persons with the surname ==
- Adam Harman (born 1977), American pianist
- Anna Harman (born 1994), Canadian engineer
- Alexander Harman (1921–1996), American judge
- Alfred Harman, Australian engineer known for Harman geared locomotive
- Alfred Hugh Harman (1841–1913), British photography pioneer
- Allan Harman (born 1936), Australian theologian
- Andrew Harman (born 1964), British science fiction author
- Avraham Harman (1915–1992), Israeli diplomat and university president
- Barry Michael Harman (born 1952), American screenwriter
- Brad Harman (born 1985), Australian baseball player
- Brian Harman (born 1987), American golfer
- Brooke Harman (born 1985), Australian actress
- Buddy Harman (1928–2008), American drummer
- Charles Harman (1894–1970), British Court of Appeal of England and Wales judge
- Charles D. Harman, British investment banker
- Chris Harman (1942–2009), British journalist and left-wing political activist
- Chris Harman (composer) (born 1970), Canadian composer
- Denham Harman (1916–2014), American biogerontologist
- Fred Harman (1902–1982), American cartoonist
- Emma Harman (1912–2020), American politician
- Estelle Harman (1922–1995), American acting coach
- George Harman (British Army officer) (1830–1892)
- George Harman (1874–1975), Irish cricketer and rugby union player
- Gilbert Harman (1938–2021), American philosopher
- Glyn Harman (born 1956), British mathematician
- Graham Harman (born 1968), American philosopher
- Harjit Harman (born 1975), Indian Punjabi singer
- Harriet Harman (born 1950), British politician, MP for Camberwell and Peckham
- Harry Harman (1913–1976), American statistician
- Harvey Harman (1900–1969), American football coach
- Henry John Harman (died 1883), Royal Engineers surveyor in India
- Hugh Harman (1903–1982), American animator and film producer
- Jack Harman (British Army officer) (1920–2009), British Army officer
- James Harman (1946–2021), American blues harmonica player, singer, and songwriter
- Jane Harman (born 1945), American politician, member of the House of Representatives for California
- Jasmine Harman (born 1975), British television presenter (A Place in the Sun)
- Jennifer Harman (born 1964), American poker player
- Sir Jeremiah Harman (judge) (1930–2021) controversial English High Court Judge who resigned in 1998
- Jeremiah Harman Esq. (1764–1844) English banker
- John Harman (British politician) (born 1950), British civil servant, former chairman of the Environment Agency
- John B. Harman (1907–1994), British physician, expert witness in the trial of John Bodkin Adams
- John Pennington Harman (1914–1944), British soldier, recipient of the Victoria Cross
- Katie Harman (born 1980), American singer, actress, and Miss America
- Louise Harman (stage name Lady Sovereign), (born 1985), British rapper
- Ľubomír Harman (born 1962), Slovak spree killer responsible for the 2010 Bratislava shooting
- Mark Harman (translator) (born 1951), Irish translator
- Mark Harman (computer scientist), British computer scientist
- Moses Harman (1830–1910), American schoolteacher, publisher, and activist
- Nigel Harman (born 1973), British actor (EastEnders)
- Oren Harman (born 1973), Israeli writer and academic
- Pete Harman (1919–2014), American businessman, co-founder of Kentucky Fried Chicken
- Richard Harman (politician) (fl. 1621–1646), English politician
- Richard Harman (cricketer) (1859–1927), New Zealand sportsman
- Richard Harman (journalist), New Zealand broadcaster
- Richard James Strachan Harman (1826–1902), Irish-born New Zealand early settler
- Richard Strachan De Renzy Harman (1896–1953), New Zealand architect
- Roger Harman (born 1941), English cricketer
- Sabrina Harman (born 1978), American soldier
- Samuel Bickerton Harman (1819–1892), Canadian lawyer, mayor of Toronto (1869–1870)
- Sidney Harman (1918–2011), American businessman
- Thomas Harman (writer) (fl. 1566), English author
- Tom Harman (born 1941), American politician from California
- Tony Harman (1912–1999), English farmer
- William Harman (1869–1962), Irish cricketer
- Willis Harman (1918–1997), American academic
- Zina Harman (1914–2013), Israeli politician, member of the Knesset (1969–1974)

== Fictional characters ==
- Joe Harman, the main male character in Neville Shute's novel A Town Like Alice

== See also ==
- Harmon (name)
- Halman (surname)
- Holman (surname)
- Hallman (disambiguation)
