= Harmon (name) =

Harmon is the English cognate of the Germanic names Hermann or Harmann. It may be a surname or given name.

== As a given name ==
- Harmon P. Burroughs (1846–1907), American farmer and politician
- Harmon Dobson (1913–1967), American entrepreneur and co-founder of Whataburger
- Harmon Killebrew (1936–2011), American baseball player
- Harmon Murray (1868 or 1869 – 1891), American gangster and serial killer
- Harmon T. Ogdahl (1917–2009), American politician and businessman
- Harmon Rabb, fictional character in 1990s and 2000s American television series JAG
- Harmon Wilfred, stateless businessman based in New Zealand
- Harmon Wray (1946–2007), American prison reformer, human rights and death penalty activist

== As a surname ==
- Angie Harmon (born 1972), American model/actress
- Antonio Harmon (born 2002), American football player
- Butch Harmon (born 1943), American golfer
- Byron Hill Harmon (1876–1942), pioneering photographer of the Canadian Rockies
- Charles Harmon (died 1886), Liberian politician
- Chuck Harmon (1924–2019), American baseball player
- Claude Harmon (1916–1989), American golfer
- Clifford B. Harmon (1866–1945), American sportsman and aviator
- Dan Harmon (born 1973), American writer and performer
- Daniel Williams Harmon (1778–1843), Canadian fur trader and diarist
- Deborah Harmon (born 1951), American film and television actress
- Dick Harmon (1947–2006), American golfer
- Elaine D. Harmon (1919–2015), American aviator
- Elise Harmon (1909–1985), American scientist in chemistry and physics
- Emmett Harmon, Liberian member of the World Scout Committee
- Ernest N. Harmon (1894–1979), World War II United States Army general
- George Harmon (disambiguation), several people
- Glen Harmon (1921–2007), Canadian ice hockey defenceman
- Henry Harmon (1839–1889), American politician
- Jennifer Harmon (1943–2026), American actress
- Jessica Harmon (born 1985), Canadian actress and director
- Joy Harmon (1940–2026), American actress
- Judson Harmon (1846–1927), Democratic governor of Ohio and US Attorney General
- Justin Harmon (born 2001), American basketball player
- Kelvin Harmon (born 1997), American football player
- Leon Harmon (1922–1982), American cyberneticist
- Leonard Roy Harmon (1917–1942), American decorated sailor
- Malone M. Harmon, American engineer
- Mamie Harmon (1906–1993), American artist, editor
- Marie Harmon (1923–2021), American actress
- Mark Harmon (born 1951), American actor
- Mickey Harmon (1984–2025), American artist
- Mike Harmon (born 1958), American race car driver
- Millard Harmon (1888–1945), United States Army Air Force general
- Patrick "Paddy" Harmon (1876–1930), American businessman, sports promoter and builder of the Chicago Stadium
- Raymond Salvatore Harmon (born 1974), American media artist
- Richard Harmon (born 1991), Canadian actor
- Robert Harmon (born 1953), American film and television director
- Rori Harmon (born 2003), American basketball player
- Terry Harmon (born 1944), American baseball player
- Tina Harmon (1969–1981), American murder and rape victim
- Tom Harmon (1919–1990), American football player
- William Harmon (born 1938), American poet
- William E. Harmon, founder of William E. Harmon Foundation; Harlem Renaissance patron

== See also ==
- Harman (surname)
