= Holman =

Holman may refer to:

== People ==
- Holman (surname), including people with the name
- Holman (given name), a list of people with the name

== Places ==
=== United States ===
- Holman, Missouri, a former town
- Holman, Texas, a settlement
- Holman, Washington, a stop on the Ilwaco Railway and Navigation Company's narrow gauge line
- Holman, West Virginia, an unincorporated community
- Holman Correctional Facility, a state prison near the city of Atmore, Alabama
- Holman Stadium (Nashua), New Hampshire
- Holman Stadium (Vero Beach), Florida
- St. Paul Downtown Airport, also known as "Holman Field", Minnesota

=== Elsewhere ===
- The former name for Ulukhaktok, Northwest Territories, Canada
  - Ulukhaktok/Holman Airport, Northwest Territories
- Holman's Bridge, in Aylesbury, Buckinghamshire, UK
- Holman Dome, a nunatak on David Island, Antarctica
- 3666 Holman, a main-belt asteroid

== Other uses ==
- Holman Brothers, a former mining equipment manufacture founded in 1801 based in Camborne, Cornwall, UK
- Holman Bible Publishers, publishers of the Holman Christian Standard Bible
  - Holman Christian Standard Bible
- Holman Industries, an Australian irrigation and plumbing supplies manufacturer
- Holman Preamplifier, produced by the Apt Corporation and named for Tomlinson Holman
- Holman Projector, an anti-aircraft weapon used by the Royal Navy during the Second World War
- Holman Rule, a legislative rule U.S. Congress allowing the pay of a federal government employee to be reduced; named for William S. Holman
- Holman's Regiment of Militia, reinforcements for the Continental Army during the American Revolutionary War

== See also ==
- Hollman, a surname
- Justice Holman (disambiguation)
