= Holman (surname) =

Origin
- Meaning: "holy man", "dweller in a hollow", "dweller by holly", "dweller on an island"
- Region of origin: England, Netherlands

Other names
- Variant forms: Hollman, Holeman

Holman is an English and Dutch surname first recorded in Essex, England in the subsidy rolls of 1327. There are variants including Hollman and Holeman. It is uncommon as a given name.

There are three main theories as to the meaning of the name, one occupational and two topographical:

- "Holy man" – stemming from the Old English words Hol or Hool, meaning holy.
- "Dweller in a hollow (hole)" – stemming from the Old English hohl, meaning hollow or hole.
- "Dweller by a holly tree/Dweller on an island" – from Middle English holm, meaning holly or island.

== Notable Holmans ==
People with the surname or its variants include:

- Ada Augusta Holman (1869–1949), Australian journalist and novelist
- Adrian Holman (1895–1974), British diplomat
- Benjamin Holman (1930–2007), American newspaper and television reporter
- Bernard Holman (1941–1988), British-New Zealand artist
- Bill Holman (cartoonist) (1903–1987), American cartoonist
- Bill Holman (musician) (1927–2024), American songwriter and musician
- Bob Holman, American poet
- Brad Holman (born 1968), American Major League Baseball pitcher
- Brett Holman (born 1984), Australian Association football forward
- Brian Holman (born 1965), American Major League Baseball pitcher
- C. Hugh Holman (1914–1981), American literary scholar
- Cal Holman (1931–2007), American politician
- Clare Holman (born 1964), British actress
- Claude Holman (1904–1973), American attorney and politician
- Cliff Holman (1929–2008), American television personality
- David Holman, American television producer
- Dávid Holman (born 1993), Hungarian footballer
- Derek Holman (1931–2019), British choral conductor, organist, and composer
- Derk Holman (1916–1982), Dutch ceramist and sculptor
- Diana Holman-Hunt (1913–1993), British memoir writer and art critic
- Dorothy Holman (1883–1968), British tennis player
- Eddie Holman (born 1946), American singer
- Edward Holman (1904–1951), Australian politician
- Emily Elizabeth Holman (1854–1925), American architect
- Francis Holman (1729–1784), British maritime painter
- Frank B. Holman (1930–2005), American politician
- Frank E. Holman (1886–1967), American attorney
- Frederick Holman (swimmer) (1885–1913), British breaststroke swimmer, Olympic gold medal winner
- Frederick Van Voorhies Holman (1852–1927), American attorney and civic leader
- Gary Holman (baseball) (born 1944), American baseball player
- Gary Holman (politician), Canadian politician
- Grant Holman (born 2000), American Major League Baseball pitcher
- Hannah Holman, American fashion model
- Hans-Jørgen Holman (1925–1986), Norwegian-American musicologist and educationalist
- Harm Holman (born 1957), Dutch politician
- Harry Holman (1842–1947), American actor
- J. Martin Holman (born 1957), American translator of Japanese literature
- James Holman (1786–1857), British traveller and writer
- James Sanders Holman (1804–1867), American politician
- Jeffrey Paparoa Holman (born 1947), New Zealand poet, writer, and academic
- Jerry Holman, American basketball player
- Jesse Lynch Holman (1784–1842), American judge
- John Holman (engineer) (1819–1890), Cornish founder of Holman Brothers
- John Holman (NASCAR) (1918–1975), American NASCAR owner
- John Holman (politician) (1872–1925), Australian politician
- John Holman (British Army officer) (1938–2011), British Army officer and cricketer
- John Holman (writer) (born 1951), American short story writer
- Joseph George Holman (1764–1817), English actor and dramatist
- Joseph W. Holman (1890–1952), American architect
- Keith Holman (1927–2011), Australian rugby league footballer
- Kurt Holman, Canadian politician
- Kwame Holman, American journalist, correspondent, producer and reporter
- Libby Holman (1904–1971), American singer
- Lucia Ruggles Holman (1793–1886), teacher and letter writer; first American woman to sail around the world
- Lydia Holman (1868–1960), American nurse who dedicated her life to promoting rural public health
- M. Carl Holman (1919–1988), African-American author, poet and playwright
- Marshall Holman (born 1954), American professional bowler
- Matthew J. Holman (born 1967), American astrophysicist
- May Holman (1893–1939), Australian politician
- Michael Holman (priest), British former headmaster of Wimbledon College
- Michael Holman (filmmaker), American artist, writer, filmmaker and musician
- Nat Holman (1896–1995), American Hall of Fame basketball player
- Nels Holman (1861–1946), American politician
- Nicholas Holman (1771–1862), Cornish engineer, father of John Holman of Holman Brothers
- Pablo Holman (born 1988), Chilean musician, member of the band Kudai
- Patrick Holman (born 1945), English cricketer
- Percy Holman (1891–1978), British politician
- Portia Holman (1903–1983), Australian child psychiatrist
- Ralph Holman (1917–2012), American biochemist
- Ralph M. Holman (1914–2013), American attorney and senior judge
- Ray Holman (born 1944), Trinidadian musician
- Rex Holman (1935–2025), American film and television actor
- Sir Robert Holman (1510-1581), Dragoon of Lincolnshire
- Rodney Holman (born 1960), American football player
- Rufus C. Holman (1877–1959), American politician
- Ryan Holman (born 1986), Dutch soccer player
- Scott Earl Holman (born 1954), American jazz musician
- Sheri Holman (born 1966), American writer
- Steve Holman (sportscaster) (born 1954), American sports broadcaster
- Theodor Holman (born 1953), Dutch author, script writer, and journalist
- Tomlinson Holman, American film technologist
- Walter Holman (born 1949), American football player
- William Holman (1871–1934), British-born Australian politician
- William S. Holman (1822–1897), American attorney, judge, and politician
- Willie Holman (1945–2002), American football player
- William Steele Holman (1822–1897), Indiana Congressman

== See also ==
- Hollman
- Holeman
- Halman (surname)
- Harman (surname)
