= Kurt Werth =

American writer

Kurt Werth (September 21, 1896 – August 25, 1983) was a German-born illustrator best known for American children's books.

Werth was born September 21, 1896, in Leipzig, Germany. He studied at the Hochschule für Grafik und Buchkunst Leipzig in Leipzig beginning in 1913. He studied there for two years before being drafted into the German army. After his two years of service he returned to the academy. His professor was influenced by Cézanne, although the public wasn't yet aware of the new trend of cubism in art. At the academy, Werth studied the new graphic techniques and tried them out as illustrations of literary works. After graduating, Werth began to illustrate books, the first being Shakespeare's Troilus and Cressida which was well received.

Werth moved to Munich, Germany after graduating, to draw satirical cartoons for various Munich magazines. In 1928, he and his wife Margaret, a Jewish German, moved to Berlin, Germany so that she could become part of the City Theater. In Berlin, Werth continued to draw satirical cartoons for Berlin magazines.

With Hitler's increasing power, the magazines folded, and Margaret Werth, who was Jewish, was not allowed to work. In the 1939 the Werths emigrated to the United States where Werth found employment illustrating a Sunday column in the New York Times magazine.

Werth began drawing political cartoons for a wide number of U.S. magazines with a political bent once the U.S. became involved in World War II. After the war Werth began to illustrate children's books. One of his first attempts was Rosalys Hall's The Merry Miller. This attempt led to many other offers for illustrating work.

Werth became a United States citizen in 1947.

Werth states, "As a German I was certainly influenced by the tradition of exact and thorough training in drawing. This goes back to Dürer and even farther." He attempts to illustrate children's books in a "modern style". "Books have to be illustrated in our times. They should show the style of our times. Not all of them do it."

Kurt Werth died in New York City on August 25, 1983.

== Awards ==
- Lewis Carroll Shelf Award in 1969 for McBroom Tells the Truth by Sid Fleischman
- Golden Kite Award in 1973 for McBroom the Rainmaker by Sid Fleischman,
- New Jersey Institute of Technology Award in 1971 for That Jefferson Boy.

== Illustrated books ==
- Higgledy-Piggledy Room; by Elizabeth Ryan. 1948
- No Ducks For Dinner; story by Rosalys Hall. 1953
- Once the Mullah; Persian folk tales retold by Alice Geer Kelsey. 1954
- One Mitten Lewis; by Helen Kay, pseud. 1955
- The story of San Francisco; by Charlotte E Cobden Jackson. 1955
- An Elephant in the Family by James Playsted Wood; 1957
- Danger in the Everglades by Frederick W. Keith. 1957
- The year without a Santa Claus. by Phyllis McGinley. 1957
- The thing at the foot of the bed and other scary tales. by Maria Leach. 1959
- Stop It, Moppit! by Geraldine Ross, 1959
- Noodles, nitwits, and numskulls by Maria Leach. 1961
- Tony's birds. by Millicent Selsam. 1961
- A tiger called Thomas. by Charlotte Zolotow. 1963
- Hear ye of Boston. by Polly Curren. 1964
- The luck book. by Maria Leach. 1964
- The valiant tailor, by Kurt Werth. 1965
- Sailor Tom, by Edna Boutwell. 1966
- The legends of Paul Bunyan. by Roberta Strauss Feuerlicht. 1966
- McBroom tells the truth, by Sid Fleischman. 1966
- McBroom and the big wind, by Sid Fleischman. 1967
- The monkey, the lion, and the snake, by Kurt Werth. 1967
- King Thrushbeard. by Kurt Werth. 1968
- That Lincoln boy. by Earl Schenck Miers. 1968
- One dark night. by Edna Mitchell Preston. 1969
- McBroom's Ear, by Sid Fleischman; Kurt Werth. 1969
- Lazy Jack. by Kurt Werth. 1970
- Samuel Clemens. by Charles Michael Daugherty. 1970
- How a piglet crashed the Christmas party, by Boris Vladimirovich Zakhoder. 1971
- McBroom's zoo, by Sid Fleischman. 1972
- Herbert's stilts, by Hazel Hutchins Wilson. 1972
- McBroom the rainmaker, by Sid Fleischman. 1973
- Molly and the giant, by Kurt Werth; Mabel Watts. 1973
- Dick Whittington and His Cat. by Eva Moore. 1974
- The three beggar kings. by Rosalys Haskell Hall. 1974
- The newcomers; ten tales of American immigrants by Joseph Raskin; Edith Raskin. 1974
