= Elise Harmon =

American chemical engineer

Elise F. Harmon
- Born: Elise Frances Harmon; September 3, 1909; Mount Enterprise, Texas
- Died: March 6, 1985 (aged 75); Redwood City, California
- Resting place: IOOF Cemetery, Denton, Texas
- Other name: E'lise F. Harmon
- Education: University of North Texas (1931 BS Chemistry), University of Texas at Austin (1938 MS Biology)
- Known for: Printed circuit board microminiaturization, creating processes for manufacturing some of the first printed circuits on plastic substrates
- Engineering career
- Discipline: Printed circuit board manufacturing, materials research and engineering
- Employers: United States Naval Research Laboratory, National Bureau of Standards, Aerovox Corporation, American Bosch Arma, Autonetics, Harmon Technical Consultants
- Significant design: Improved performance of electrical components (motors, generators) of WW II aircraft in extreme environments
- Significant advance: Hot die stamp method to create printed circuits in which silver conductors are infused on thermoplastics and thermosetting materials (patents)
- Awards: 1956 Society of Women Engineers Achievement Award; 1968 IPC President's Award

Elise (aka E'Lise) Frances Harmon (3 September 1909 – 6 March 1985 in Santa Clara County, California) was an American chemist and biologist by education and engineer by practice who invented several technologies in the emerging printed circuit board industry in the 1950s that allowed efficient printing of circuit elements on plastic substrate and continued making significant engineering innovations in circuit miniaturization into the 1970s. She also conducted critical research on the performance of electrical equipment in aircraft under extreme conditions that enhanced aircraft performance in World War II.

== Early life and education ==
Harmon graduated from Marshall High School in Marshall, Texas in 1927.

She earned a Bachelor of Science in chemistry in 1931 from North Texas State College (now University of North Texas) in Denton TX, a Master of Science in biology from the University of Texas in 1938, and took advanced coursework at several institutions. Harmon did post-graduate work at several institutions. Subjects she pursued included engineering at George Washington University, and polymer chemistry, mathematics, and mechanical engineering at the University of Maryland, College Park.

In June 1930, while a student, she was elected president of the W.N. Masters Chemical Society, a student organization she joined as a freshman in 1927, sponsored by Wallace Newton Masters (1864–1943), founder of the chemistry department in 1910.

== Career highlights ==
=== Research and Development ===
From 1942 to 1951, Harmon worked first in the United States Naval Research Laboratory's Aircraft and Electrical Division, then in the Heat and Power and Ordnance Divisions at the National Bureau of Standards in Washington, D.C. During World War II at the Naval Research Laboratory and later in the Heat and Power Division, she worked on engineering problems such as temperature range in aircraft electrical equipment, high altitude carbon brush performance in aircraft motors and generators and the action of lubricants in high-speed bearings. Her work allowed aircraft motors and generators to operate safely at higher altitudes. In the Ordnance Division she performed engineering research on proximity fuses and guided missiles. She also designed, placed into operation, and tested equipment for the industrial production of printed circuits for military applications.

In 1952, she moved to the Aerovox Corporation, headquartered at Plant 2 in New Bedford, Massachusetts. In the 1970s, as head of Aerovox Corporations's printed circuit activities, she directed the research, development and pilot plan procedures for an entirely new method of printed circuitry and printed circuit components. One of Harmon's major contributions to the field was the development of a hot die stamp method to create printed circuits in which silver conductors were infused on thermoplastics and thermosetting materials. She and Philip J. Franklin (né Philip Jacquins Franklin; 1909–1979) were awarded a patent in 1953 for this technological breakthrough. Harmon also researched the action of grease and lubricants in high speed ball bearings.

From 1957 to 1962, Harmon worked for the American Bosch Arma Corporation in Garden City, New York. As senior engineer, she developed microminiaturization research and development programs related to advanced computers. She liaised with the Manufacturing Department on Arma's Inertial Guidance System for the Atlas ICBM and focused on microminiaturization in extraterrestrial vehicles and telemetry.

From 1962 to 1970, she was a senior engineer for Autonetics, a division of Rockwell International Corporation in Anaheim, California, where she was responsible for advanced technology for the fabrication of multilayer circuit boards for the Minuteman program. This included developing and testing a specific micro-miniature circuit fabrication and packaging technology.

=== Consulting ===
She started Harmon Technical Consultants in 1970 and provided her expertise to numerous national and international corporations in the areas of printed circuits and multilayer board production problems. Her clients included commercial printed circuit board producers such as Magnavox, aerospace companies Raytheon and Honeywell, and international clients such as Nippon Aviatronics.

=== Teaching ===
Harmon taught chemistry, physics, and biology at the Brownsville Junior High School from about 1934 to 1937. She later taught those subjects at Texas Junior College, the University of North Texas, and University of Texas at Austin.

== Memberships and affiliations ==
- American Chemical Society — Harmon became a member in 1950
- Institute of Radio Engineers
- Texas Academy of Sciences
- Society of Women Engineers

== Awards and honors ==
Harmon was awarded the 1956 Society of Women Engineers Achievement Award for her specialty in printed circuits. Harmon was awarded the 1968 IPC President's Award, honoring those who made the most significant contributions to IPC programs during the term of office of each departing IPC president

Harmon has been listed in the Marquis Who's Who of American Women, American Women in Technology encyclopedia, Gale Group Notable Scientists, Gale Research Notable Twentieth Century Scientists, Biographical Dictionary of Women in Science, International Handbook of Aerospace Awards and Trophies, the Women's Book of World Records and Achievements, Chronology of Women's History, Women Scientists in America.

== Selected published works ==
- "Interconnection of Integrated Circuit Flat Packs in Autonetics Improved Minuteman Program," by Elise F. Harmon, IEEE Transactions on Component Parts (journal), Vol. 11, No. 2 (1964), pps. 135–144; ISSN 0097-6601, OCLC 4653138666
- "Fabrication of Multilayer Boards at Autonetics for Minuteman II Program," by Elise F. Harmon, Anaheim, California: North American Aviation / Autonetics (1965); OCLC 258395160
- Presented at the Multilayer Seminar, sponsored by Milton S. Kiver Publications, Inc. (Milton Sol Kiver; 1918–2005), and Electronic Packaging and Production (magazine), New York, New York, March 22–25, 1965
- "Method of Making a Photosensitive Solder Maskant," United States Department of the Air Force, Fort Belvoir Defense Technical Information Center, December 21, 1973; OCLC 227239303, 831431571
- "Sliding Contacts at High Altitudes, Experimental System for Carbon Brush Investigations," PB129176 (U.S. Publications Board Number), by E.F. Harmon, E-3176 (NRL Formal Report Number), September 1947 (date of report). Bibliography of Unclassified NRL Formal Reports Numbers 1000 to 5700, U.S. Naval Research Laboratory, July 1962, pg. 52; OCLC 15697667, 831978265, 227304660

== Selected patents ==
She held numerous patents including:

1953 US 2656570 A: "Plastic Matrix for Printing Resistors" (hot die stamp method of infusing silver conductors on polymerized materials) (Note: Gazette, Vol. 675, October 1953, pg. 922 Elise F. Harmon & Philip J. Franklin, Assignors to the U.S.A. as represented by the Secretary of the Army "Plastic matrix for printing resistors" US 2656570 A, filed November 15, 1951, serial no. 256,584, granted October 27, 1953)
1953 US 2844172 A: "Silk Screen Stretcher" (mechanism for stretching fabric to obtain uniform tautness) (Note: Gazette, July 1958 E'lise F. Harmon, Assignors to the U.S.A. as represented by the Secretary of the Army "Silk Screen Stretcher" US 2844172 A, filed November 13, 1953, serial no. 392,066, granted July 22, 1958)
Injection printing machine for film resistors
Improved high altitude carbon brush performance, enabling American airplanes to maintain superiority during WWII

== Death ==
Harmon died March 6, 1985, in Santa Clara County, California, while a resident of Redwood City, California. She is buried in Section P, Block 35, Grave 1 of the IOOF Cemetery, Denton, Texas, next to her mother, Geoffie Harmon (1887–1931), in Grave 2, and brother, Hamlett Stephen Harmon (1913–1997), in Grave 3. The three grave sites were purchased in 1931 by her father, George Herbert Harmon (1881–1957).

== Family ==
Harmon had a brother and a sister. Her brother Ham Harmon, played professional football with the Chicago Cardinals in 1937 for one season. Her sister Ann Ferrari, participated in the Salk Polio Vaccine field trail, and served as instructor of Physical Therapy at Stanford.

== Further resources ==
- "Harmon, Elise F.," Society of Women Engineers Records (LR001539), Box 189, Folder 4, Walter P. Reuther Library, Archives of Labor and Urban Affairs, Wayne State University
- "Autumn Stanley Papers," Iowa State University, Special Collections, Box 77, Folder 64, Dates: 1953–2003
