= Hallman =

Hallman may refer to:

== People ==
- Andrew P. Hallman, American intelligence official
- Arnette Hallman (born 1958), American former professional basketball player
- Bill Hallman (second baseman) (1867–1920), American Major League Baseball player and manager
- Bill Hallman (outfielder) (1876–1950), American Major League Baseball player
- Cinda Hallman (1944–2007), American business executive
- Curley Hallman (born 1947), head football coach at LSU and Southern Mississippi
- Dennis Hallman (born 1975), American mixed martial arts fighter
- Enzo Hallman (born 2007), Swedish racing driver
- Gene Hallman (born 1959), American sports marketing and event management entrepreneur
- Harold Hallman (1962–2005), Canadian Football League player
- J.C. Hallman (born 1967), American author, essayist, and researcher
- Joseph Hallman (born 1979), American composer
- Ricardo Hallman (born 2003), American football player
- Sherwood H. Hallman (1913–1944), United States Army soldier and recipient of the Medal of Honor
- Torsten Hallman (born 1940), Swedish professional motocross racer

== Places ==
- Hallman, Pennsylvania, a populated area in East Pikeland, Pennsylvania, U.S.
