= Holeman =

Holeman is a surname. Notable people with the surname include:

- William Holman (1871–1934), Australian statesman
- John Holeman (born 1963), American surfer
- John Dee Holeman (1929–2021), American Piedmont blues guitarist, singer, and songwriter
- Linda Holeman, Canadian writer

It's also the name of comic book #214 of Jommeke.
