= Mamie Harmon =

American artist

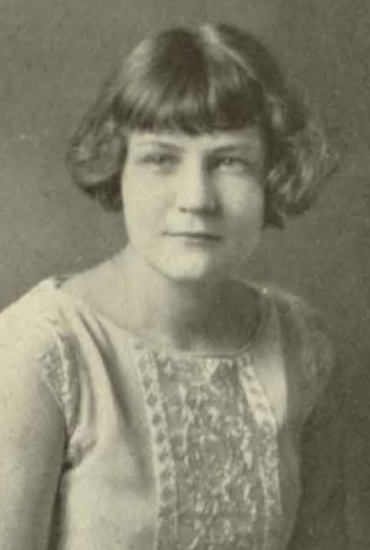
- Mamie Harmon, from the 1926 yearbook of Wesleyan College
- Born: October 3, 1906; Macon, Georgia, U.S.
- Died: June 19, 1993 (age 92); Red Bank, New Jersey, U.S.
- Occupations: Artist, arts editor
- Relatives: George F. Harmon (brother)

Mamie Harmon (October 3, 1906 – June 19, 1993) was an American artist, educator, and arts editor. She completed and edited The Natural Way to Draw (1941) by her teacher Kimon Nicolaïdes, and wrote, edited, and illustrated other books. Her papers are in the collection of the Archives of American Art.

== Early life and education ==
Harmon was born in Macon, Georgia, the daughter of James Alston Harmon and Mamie Feagin Harmon. Her father was a Methodist minister; her older brother George F. Harmon was a collegiate basketball star. She attended Lanier High School and Wesleyan College in Macon, where she was president of the dramatic club, a member of the debate team, captain of the basketball team, and manager of the tennis team.

Harmon studied art at Lake Junaluska summer school as a teen, and with Kimon Nicolaïdes at the Art Students League of New York and in New Hampshire. She also studied at the Art Institute of Chicago, and earned a master's degree in English at the University of Chicago, with a thesis titled "The Clergyman in Restoration Comedy" (1927).

== Career ==
Harmon taught school in Tennessee as a young woman. She lived in China from 1928 to 1932, while her father was a missionary there, and taught at a school in Shanghai. After Nicolaïdes' death in 1938, Harmon organized a 1939 memorial exhibition at the GRD Studio in New York, and completed his unfinished manuscript, which became the book The Natural Way to Draw (1941). She was managing editor of reference books at Funk & Wagnalls from 1933 to 1945, and edited other art books including Jules Heller's Printmaking Today (1973). She spent eight years based in Rome as advisory editor of The Encyclopedia of World Art, while it was being translated into Italian. She also illustrated books, including Maria Leach's The Soup Stone (1954) and God Had a Dog (1961), and wrote encyclopedia articles on art topics.

== Publications ==
- "The Glory of the Sky" (1926, poem)
- Kimon Nicolaïdes, The Natural Way to Draw (1941, editor)
- Maria Leach, The Soup Stone (1954, illustrator)
- Maria Leach, God Had a Dog: Folklore of the Dog (1961, illustrator)
- Igor Kipnis, His First Solo Recordings (1962, photographer)
- The Encyclopedia of World Art (1960s, advisory editor)
- Three Spiritual Classics (1960s, cover designer)
- Remember Miss Wallace? (1969)
- Jules Heller, Printmaking Today (1973, editor)

== Personal life and legacy ==
Harmon's partner was Theresa Callow Brakeley (1912–2011), who was also an editor that specialized in arts topics. They shared an apartment in Greenwich Village and a summer home in Nova Scotia. Harmon died in 1993, at the age of 87, in Red Bank, New Jersey. Her nephew Tom Harmon's wife, Carolyn, donated her papers in the Archives of American Art, and her artworks to several museums and the Boston Art Club.
