= Halman (surname) =

Halman is a surname of English and Turkish origin.

== List of people with the surname ==
- James Halman (died 1702), Master of Gonville and Caius College, Cambridge
- Abdullah Halman (born 1987), Turkish footballer
- Ella Halman (1906–1995), English opera singer
- Greg Halman (1987–2011), Dutch baseball player
- Talât Sait Halman (1931–2014), Turkish poet
- Tim Halman, Canadian politician

== See also ==
- Harman (surname)
- Holman (surname)
