= Arma Micro Computer =

Early minicomputer first released in 1962

The Arma Micro Computer was an early minicomputer first released in 1962.

Manufactured by the Arma Engineering Company, it had a bit-serial architecture with a 22-bit word length, using diode-transistor logic and transfluxor-based memory.

The principle of the technology used in the transfluxor memory is described in U.S. patent 3048828.
