= Transfluxor =

Specialised type of magnetic core memory element

A transfluxor was a specialised type of magnetic core memory element in which each core had two holes, one for writing and another for reading. It had the unusual property that a core's state could be read without erasing it. In addition to binary data, transfluxors could also store analog values, with no need to drive them into core saturation.

The technology is described in U.S. patent 3048828.

Transfluxors were used in the ARMA Micro Computer.
