= Maria Leach =

American folklorist

Maria Leach (April 30, 1892 – May 22, 1977) was an American writer and editor of books on folklores of the world. A noted scholar, she compiled and edited a major reference work on folklore and was the author or editor of thirteen books for adults, young people, and children.

== Early life, education, and marriage ==
Born in New York City, Maria Leach was the former Alice-Mary Doane, daughter of Benjamin H. Doane and Mary (Davis) Doane. Her father was a native of Nova Scotia, one of Canada's three Maritime provinces. Born in Barrington, in Shelburne County, he was a descendant of the venerable family called Doane (an Anglicized form of a Gaelic name common in southern Ireland since the 1500s). In Nova Scotia he had connections to seafaring through his own father, a ship's captain. In the late 1870s or early 1880s, Benjamin Doane and his wife Mary, a native of South Carolina and an unreconstructed Rebel, moved to New York and established a home in Manhattan, where they lived for some years and raised their children.

Alice-Mary Doane spent her youth and received her early education in New York City. Upon graduation from high school she went to Earlham College in Richmond, Indiana, whose curriculum was shaped by the perspective of the Religious Society of Friends (Quakers). She then went on to study for a master's degree in anthropology at the University of Illinois in Urbana-Champaign. There she met MacEdward Leach, a student of medieval literature and philology with a strong interest in folklore. His fascination with the oral tradition of medieval folk tales was shared by Alice-Mary, who by then was known as Maria (pronounced "Ma-RYE-uh" in the British fashion), which she had adopted as a pen name. After MacEdward Leach earned a bachelor's degree in 1916 and completed his military service in World War I, he and Maria married in 1917 and moved to Baltimore, where both of them pursued graduate studies at Johns Hopkins University.

MacEdward Leach earned a master's degree at Johns Hopkins that same year, 1917. Maria continued her studies toward a doctorate in folklore in 1918–19. In 1920 he entered the University of Pennsylvania in Philadelphia and began teaching as an instructor of English. Not long after, in 1924, the Leaches became the parents of a son, Macdonald, their only child. As a young father, MacEdward Leach obtained his doctorate in English in 1930 and joined the faculty of the university in 1931 as an assistant professor of English.

== Later life and professional career ==
In 1936, Maria Leach found employment in the Philadelphia offices of Funk & Wagnalls, a scholarly publishing firm. As working parents, the Leaches then set up house in Bucks County, Pennsylvania, and some years later, once their son was away at boarding school, decided to follow mostly independent pathways. While he remained in Pennsylvania, she moved back to New York, returning to their home in Bucks County for occasional weekends. MacEdward Leach would subsequently devote his entire career to teaching and working at the university, where, among other accomplishments, he founded the program in folklore.

Maria Leach also continued to work in the burgeoning field of folklore. Having resettled in Manhattan, in Greenwich Village, she worked in the New York offices of Funk & Wagnalls as a dictionary editor. There, after her amicable divorce from MacEdward Leach in the mid-1940s, she compiled and edited the major reference work on folklore, mythology, and legend for which she is best known. From 1953 to 1958 she was a textbook editor at McGraw-Hill Book Company. During this time, in 1954, she wrote the first of what would become a substantial list of published works. In the late 1950s, she decided to retire and move to Nova Scotia. Her connection to the people of Cape Breton led her to establish residence in Shelburne County, at first in Barrington, in the Doane's family home, and then, finally, at Coffinscroft. A folklorist of international renown, she was still actively engaged in writing at the time of her death in 1977.

During her lifetime, Maria Leach was a prominent member of the American Folklore Society, for which she served as councilor. She also held memberships in the American Anthropological Association, the American Dialect Society, the Northeast Folklore Society, the Society for Ethnomusicology, the American Indian Ethnohistoric Conference, and the Religious Society of Friends. In Nova Scotia, she was active in the Canadian Folklore Society and the Cape Breton Historical Society.

== Published works ==
- Funk & Wagnalls Standard Dictionary of Folklore, Mythology, and Legend, 2 vols., edited by Leach (New York: Funk & Wagnalls, 1949); reissued in a one-volume, unabridged edition by Harper & Row in 1972 – encyclopedic (Note: Although called a dictionary, this work, at 1,236 pages, offers encyclopedic coverage of world folklore, encompassing 2,405 countries, regions, cultures, culture areas, peoples, tribes, and ethnic groups. The preface to the first edition attempts to describe the contents as "a representative sampling of the gods of the world, the folk heroes, culture heroes, tricksters, and numbskulls ... of the folklore of animals, birds, plants, insects, stones, gems, minerals, stars ... dances, ballads, folk songs ... festivals and rituals ... food customs ... games, rimes, riddles, tongue twisters ... diviners and 'lookmen', witches, witchcraft, omens, magic charms and spells ... and the supernatural beings of folk belief and story, such as demons, ogres, fairies and 'little people,' guardian spirits, werewolves, vampires, zombies." (page v) Band leader Jerry Garcia has reported the band name Grateful Dead was inspired by this dictionary's entry for the term "Grateful Dead" (reprinted in the 1955 The Funk and Wagnalls New Practical Standard Dictionary, Britannica World Language Edition). as being the source for the name of the band.)
- The Turnspit Dog, illustrated by Winifred Bromhall (New York: Aladdin Books, 1952)
- The Soup Stone: The Magic of Familiar Things, with decorations by Mamie Hannon (Funk & Wagnalls, 1954)
- The Beginning: Creation Myths around the World, illus. Jan Bell Fairservis (Funk & Wagnalls, 1956)
- The Rainbow Book of American Folk Tales and Legends, illus. Marc Simont (Cleveland: World Publishing, 1958)
- The Thing at the Foot of the Bed and Other Scary Tales, illus. Kurt Werth (World, 1959; London: Collins, 1959); reissued by Philomel Books in 1982
- God Had a Dog: Folklore of the Dog (New Brunswick, N.J.: Rutgers University Press, 1961)
- Noodles, Nitwits, and Numbskulls, illus. Kurt Werth (World, 1961)
- The Luck Book, illus. Kurt Werth (World, 1964)
- How the People Sang the Mountain Up: How and Why Stories, illus. Glen Rounds (New York: Viking, 1967)
- Riddle Me, Riddle Me, Ree, illus. William Wiesner (Viking, 1970); reissued by Puffin Books in 1977
- Whistle in the Graveyard: Folktales to Chill Your Bones, illus. Ken Rinciari (Viking, 1974); reissued by Penguin Books in 1982
- The Lion Sneezed: Folktales and Myths of the Cat, illus. Helen Siegel (New York: Crowell, 1977)
- The Importance of Being a Wit: The Insults of Oscar Wilde, compiled by Leach (New York: Carrol & Graf, 1997; London: Michael O'Mara, 1997) – published posthumously
