= Rosalys Hall =

American children's author (1914–2006)

Rosalys Haskell Hall (March 27, 1914 – April 17, 2006) was an American author of children's books.

Hall was seven times descended from Roger Williams and the great-grand niece of Maud Howe Elliott. She attended Ecole Sevigne, in Paris, France, New Jersey College for Women, and Ethical Culture Norman Training School.

Hall was a seller of children's books in New York at Doubleday Bookshop, from 1938-1944; and at Longman's, Green & Co. (now merged with David McKay Co., Inc., under McKay name) she worked as editor in Children's Book Department beginning in 1944. She was the fourth generation to write books beginning with Julia Ward Howe, author of "The Battle Hymn of the Republic". She was the published author of seventeen children's books. Several of her books were illustrated by Kurt Werth.

== Books ==
- No Ducks For Dinner; story by Rosalys Hall; Pictures by Kurt Werth. 1953. Oxford Univ. Press.
- The three beggar kings. by Rosalys Haskell Hall; Kurt Werth. Publisher: New York, Random House [1974]
- A bone for Jonesy by Rosalys Haskell Hall; Publisher: Newport, R.I. : Privately printed, 2004.
- The bright and shining breadboard, by Rosalys Haskell Hall; Kurt Werth. Publisher: New York, Lothrop, Lee & Shepard [1969]
- Miranda's dragon, by Rosalys Haskell Hall; Kurt Werth. Publisher: New York, McGraw-Hill [1968]
- Saint Nicholas by Rosalys Haskell Hall; Ilse Buchert Nesbitt; Publisher: Newport, R.I. : printed at the Third & Elm Press, 1980.
- Animal hide and seek, by Julia Ward Howe Hall; Rosalys Haskell Hall; Publisher: New York, Lothrop, Lee & Shepard, 1958.
- Seven for Saint Nicholas. by Rosalys Haskell Hall; Publisher: Philadelphia, Lippincott [1958]
- The merry miller by Rosalys Haskell Hall; Publisher: New York Oxford University Press 1952.
- Young fancy. by Rosalys Haskell Hall; Publisher: New York, Longmans, Green, 1960.
