= Kimon Nicolaïdes =

American artist, educator and author

Kimon Nicolaїdes
- Born: June 10, 1891; Washington, D.C., U.S.
- Died: July 18, 1938 (aged 47); Manhattan, New York, U.S.
- Other name: Kimon Nicolaides
- Education: Art Students League of New York
- Occupations: Artist, educator, author, camouflage artist
- Spouse: Anna English (m. 1922)
- Children: 3

Kimon Nicolaїdes (June 10, 1891 – July 18, 1938) was an American artist, educator, and author. During World War I, he served in the United States Army in France as a camouflage artist. He taught at the Art Students League of New York after the war. Nicolaїdes's book The Natural Way to Draw (1941) provided a new method of teaching drawing, and was widely used.

== Early life ==
Nicolaïdes was born in Washington, D.C., to Kimon Nicolaïdes, an immigrant from Greece, and Louisa (née McLaughlin), a member of an Irish-American family rooted in Saratoga Springs, New York. His father worked as an importer of Asian artifacts. Nicolaïdes was the third of four children. He made his living initially by a variety of jobs, including picture framing, journalism, and even by appearing once in a film as an extra, playing the role of an art student.

Despite his family's opposition, he did in fact become an art student, during which he attended the Art Students League of New York in New York City, where he studied with John Sloan, George Bridgman, and Kenneth Hayes Miller. At the Art Students League, he met the avant-garde couple Wilhelmina Weber Furlong and her husband Thomas Furlong.

== Career ==
He served in the U.S. Army in France during World War I, where he was one of the first American camouflage artists, serving in the American Camouflage Corps alongside Barry Faulkner, Sherry Edmundson Fry, Abraham Rattner and others. Among his wartime duties, he often worked with contour maps.

Nicolaïdes worked as a member of the board of the Louis Comfort Tiffany Foundation which administered the foundation and managed the Tiffany's Laurelton Hall estate (nicknamed the Oyster Bay estate).

=== Teaching career ===
Following World War I, he returned to New York to teach at the Art Students League of New York. One of his students was artist Revington Arthur. While teaching, he developed a method of teaching drawing that he shared in the world-famous and widely used The Natural Way to Draw (1941).

== His influence ==
At the time of Nicolaïdes's death, the manuscript for The Natural Way to Draw was incomplete. A close friend and former student, Mamie Harmon, oversaw its completion and its publication in 1941. (Harmon's papers are available in the Archives of American Art.) His influence on the teaching of drawing has been long-lasting and substantial, and his book is still in use today. In brief, he taught drawing by (1) exploring the edge of the subject with 'contour drawing', (2) encouraging free and rapid 'gesture drawing', (3) encouraging tonal drawings of weight or mass, and (4) (most importantly) prescribing a daily exercise of 'memory drawing'.

== Personal life ==
In 1922, he married Anna English. They had three sons.
