= Naomi Chazan =

Israeli academic, activist, and politician

- נעמי חזן
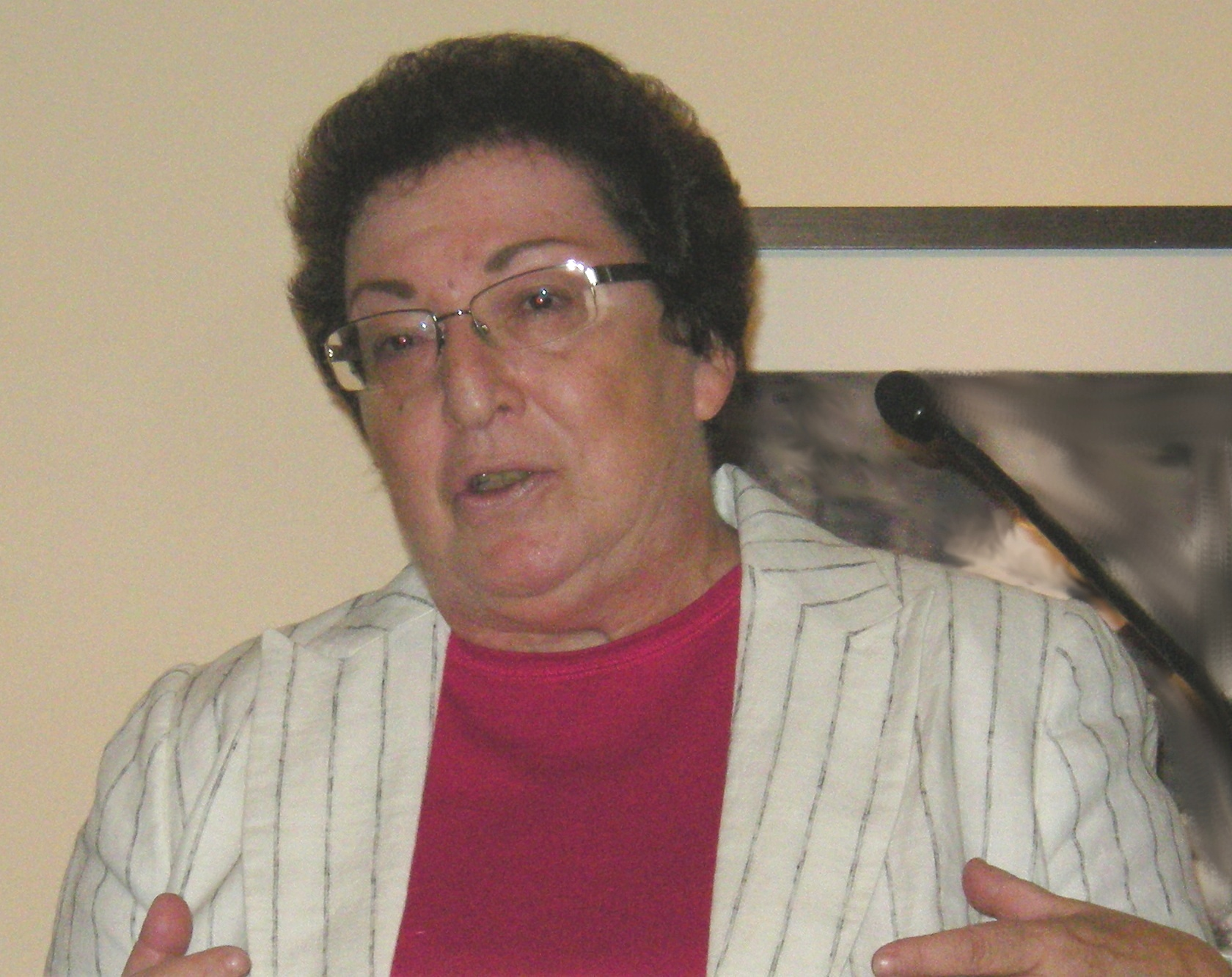

Faction represented in the Knesset
- 1992–2003: Meretz

Personal details
- Born: 18 November 1946 (age 79) Jerusalem, Mandatory Palestine

Naomi Chazan (Hebrew: נעמי חזן; born 18 November 1946) is an Israeli academic, activist, and politician. As a legislator, Chazan championed the causes of human rights, women's rights, and consumer protection. Chazan is a past president of the New Israel Fund.

Today, Chazam heads the School of Government and Society at the Academic College of Tel Aviv-Yafo, and sits on the board of the Hotline for Refugees and Migrants.

== Biography ==
Naomi Chazan (née Harman) was born in Jerusalem during the British Mandate era. Her parents were Avraham and Zina Harman. Her father was later Israeli ambassador to the United States, while her mother worked in the Ministry of Foreign Affairs and served as a member of Knesset between 1969 and 1974.

Chazan studied at Columbia University, earning a B.A. and M.A., before attending the Hebrew University of Jerusalem, where she gained a PhD. She later headed the Truman Institute for the Advancement of Peace at the university. She became a professor of political science, specializing in the politics of Africa, in 1994.

== Political career ==
In 1985 she was a member of the Israeli delegation to the UN Conference on Women in Nairobi, and in 1995 to the Fourth World Conference on Women in Beijing. She served as president of the Israeli branch of the Society for International Development, was a founder and member of the board of the Israel Women's Network, and has served as Vice President of the International Association of Political Science.

In 1992 she was elected to the Knesset on the Meretz list. She retained her seat in the 1996 elections and was made a Deputy Speaker. She was a candidate in the 1998 Jerusalem mayoral election, finishing fourth with 4% of the vote. She was re-elected to the Knesset again in 1999 and remained a Deputy Speaker until losing her seat in the 2003 elections.

She backed efforts to improve women's rights in Israel outside of the Knesset as well, including supporting the Alice Miller case which paved the way for women to serve in combat roles in the Israeli military.

== Controversy ==
A 2010 campaign by Im Tirtzu against the New Israel Fund included cartoon images of Chazan with a horn coming out of her forehead - the word "horn" in Hebrew also meaning "fund." Chazan served as the lay leader of New Israel Fund at the time. Haaretz described the campaign as "savage."

In 2010, Chazan was fired by The Jerusalem Post. The Post said the decision was made on account of a lawsuit against the newspaper filed by Chazan and the NIF. The lawsuit was filed in response to an ad campaign by Im Tirtzu.

== Published works ==
Chazan is the author, co-author and editor of eight books and 56 articles in academic journals on comparative (especially African) and Israeli politics.

- An Anatomy of Ghanaian Politics: Managing Political Recession, 1969-1982 (Westview Press, 1983, ISBN 0-86531-439-X)
- Ghana: Coping with Uncertainty (Westview Press, 1986, ISBN 0-86531-369-5), with Deborah Pellow
- Coping with Africa’s Food Crisis (Lynne Rienner Publishers, 1988, ISBN 0-931477-84-0), with Timothy M. Shaw
- The Precarious Balance: State and Society in Africa (Westview Press, 1988, ISBN 0-8133-0968-9), with Donald Rothchild
- Politics and Society in Contemporary Africa (Lynne Rienner Publishers, 1988, ISBN 0-333-46838-4), with Robert Mortimer, John Ravenhill, and Donald Rothchild; reprinted 1992 (ISBN 1555872832) and 1999 (ISBN 155587679X)
- Irredentism and International Politics (Lynne Rienner Publishers, 1991, ISBN 1-55587-221-2), edited volume
- Civil Society and the State in Africa (Lynne Rienner Publishers, 1994, ISBN 1-55587-360-X), edited with John W. Harbeson and Donald Rothchild
- The Early State in African Perspective: Culture, Power and Division of Labor (Brill Academic Publishers, 1997, ISBN 90-04-08355-3), edited with S.N. Eisenstadt and Michel Abitbol
