= Holman (given name) =

Holman is a masculine given name which may refer to:

- Holman Day (1865–1935), American author
- William Holman Hunt (1827–1910), British painter
- Holman S. Melcher (1841–1905), American Civil War officer
- Holman Williams (1912–1967), American boxer
