= Ken Rinciari =

American illustrator, children's writers, and photographer (1935–2010)

Ken Rinciari (1935–2010) was an illustrator at The New York Times, The New York Review of Books and other print publications. He was also a photographer and illustrator of children's books and limited-edition volumes of other books and stories.

== Notable works as illustrator ==
- Happiness Is a Rat Fink (1963)
- Whistle in the Graveyard – Folktales to Chill Your Bones (1974)
- The Skin Spinners (1976)
