= Holman Dome =

Nunatak in Queen Mary Land, Antarctica

Holman Dome (66°27′S 98°54′E) is a dome-shaped nunatak 2 nautical miles (4 km) southwest of Watson Bluff, on the east side of David Island, Antarctica. It was discovered by the Australasian Antarctic Expedition, 1911–14, under Mawson, who named it for William A. Holman, Premier of New South Wales in 1911.
