= Hollman =

Hollman is a surname. Notable people with the surname include:

- Ellen Hollman (born 1983), American actress
- Julie Hollman (born 1977), British heptathlete
- Ka'dar Hollman (born 1996), American football player
- Whitney Agee Hollman, American cheerleader

== See also ==
- Cape Hollman, a headland of Papua New Guinea
- Holman (disambiguation)
