= Malone M. Harmon =

American engineer

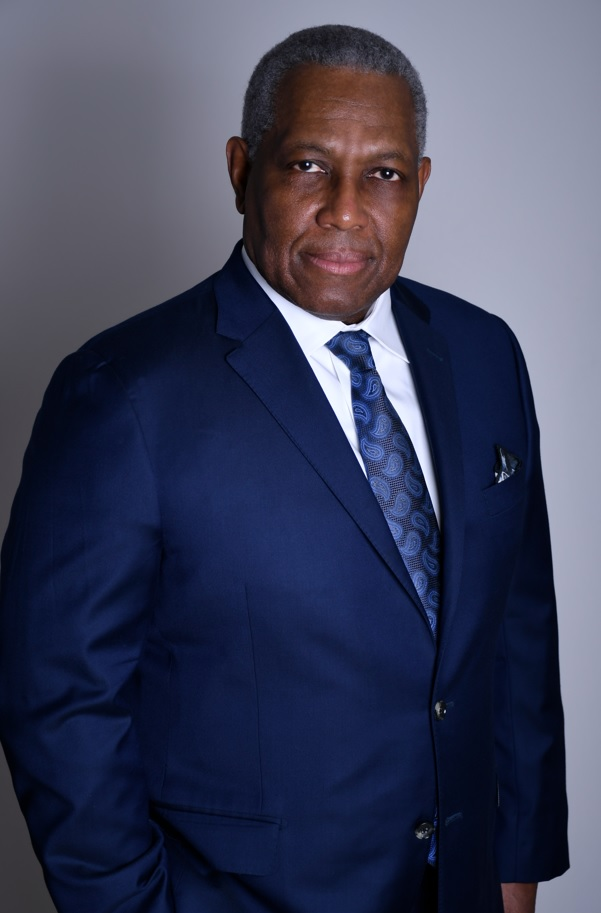
- Born: United States
- Education: Virginia Union University
- Occupation: Engineer
- Known for: StratiTech; Re-Entry Delaware

Malone M. Harmon is an American engineer. He is noted for his work as a former Electronic and Computer Systems Engineer in the US Air Force who served in Operation Desert Shield and Operation Desert Storm.

His wife, LaVerne Harmon, the President of Wilmington University, is well-known as the first African-American woman to lead a Delaware college or university.

== Education ==
Harmon is a graduate of Virginia Union University with a BS in Mathematics. He also holds a Masters Degrees in Human Resources, Business Administration, Information Systems and Information Assurance.

== Career ==
Harmon served in the US Air Force as an Electronic and Computer Systems Engineer, where he supervised a team of 20 people and maintained computer operations during Operation Desert Shield and Operation Desert Storm. He has worked in more than 70 countries for such companies as Computer Sciences Corporation, JP Morgan Chase, AstraZeneca Pharmaceuticals, ALICO Life Insurance, MetLife, DuPont, and others.

He is the Founder and CEO of StratiTech, an IT consulting company, and the non-profit organization ReEntry Delaware (or Re-Entry Delaware), a charitable non-profit organization.

== Personal life ==
He is married to LaVerne Harmon, President of Wilmington University and the first female African-American University President in the history of Delaware.
