= Arma Engineering Company =

American military technology manufacturer

- Founded: 1918
- Founder: Arthur Davis; David Mahood

The Arma Engineering Company was an American military technology manufacturer founded in New York in 1918 by Arthur Davis and David Mahood.

An early product was the U.S. naval Torpedo Data Computer, a special-purpose ship-mounted analog computer for targeting torpedoes, first deployed by the U.S. Navy in 1938.

Another Arma product was a gyrocompass based on technology originally developed by the German company Anschütz. Arma was subsequently sued by Sperry for patent infringement. The dispute was eventually resolved by the U.S. Navy contracting with both companies, with Sperry as principal supplier.

Arma merged with American Bosch in 1949 to become American Bosch Arma.

It released an early minicomputer, the Arma Micro Computer, in 1962.
