= Avraham Harman =

Israeli diplomat (1914–1992)

- אברהם הרמן
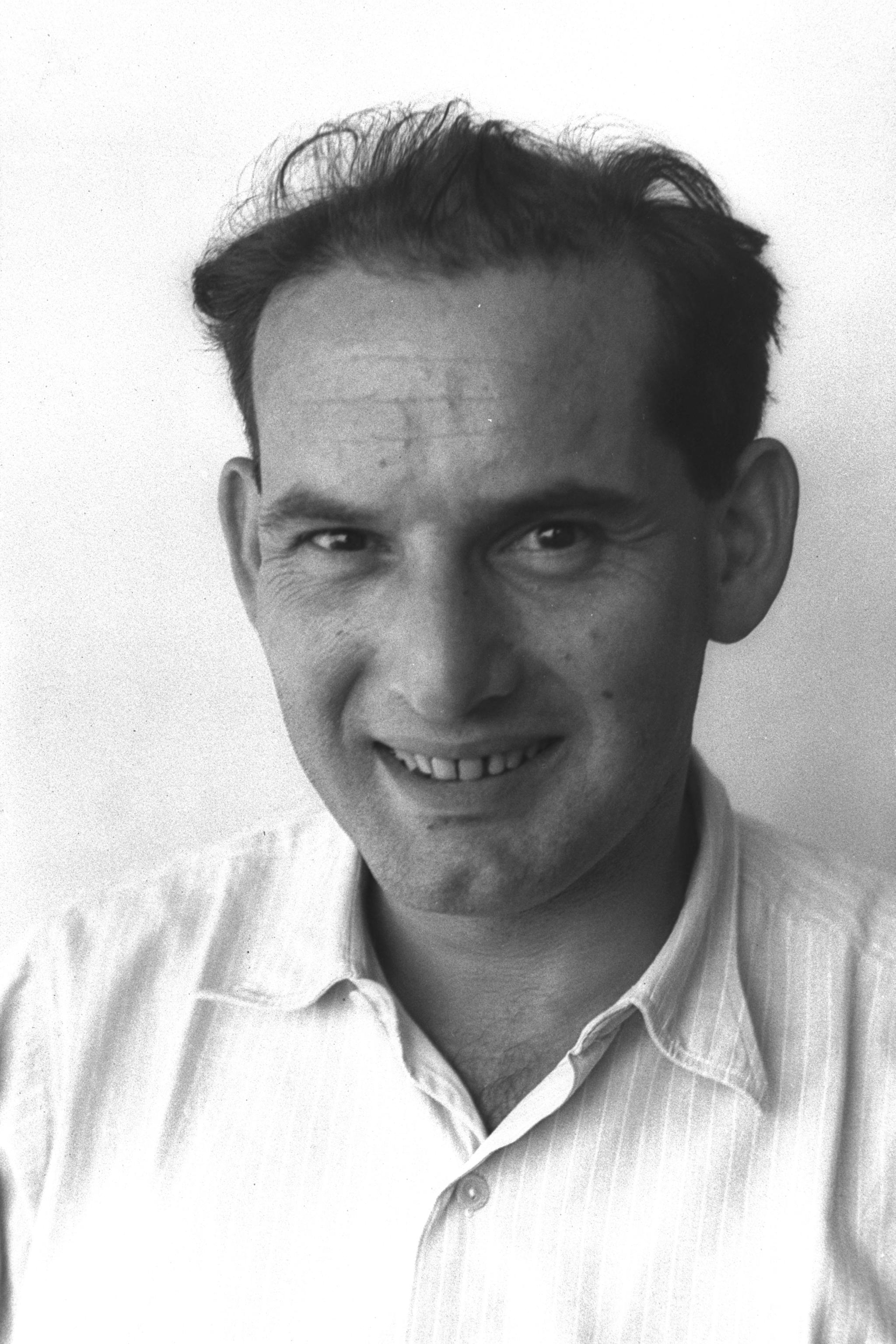
- Harman in 1950

3rd Israeli Ambassador to the United States
- In office 1959–1968
- Preceded by: Abba Eban
- Succeeded by: Yitzhak Rabin

President of Hebrew University
- In office 1968–1983

Personal details
- Born: Leslie Avraham Harman; November 7, 1914 London, England, United Kingdom
- Died: February 23, 1992 (aged 77) Jerusalem
- Spouse: Zina Harman
- Children: Naomi Chazan, Ilana Boehm, David Harman
- Education: Wadham College, Oxford
- Occupation: Diplomat and President of the Hebrew University of Jerusalem

Avraham Harman (Hebrew: אברהם הרמן; November 7, 1914 – February 23, 1992) was an Israeli diplomat and academic administrator. From 1968 to 1983, he was the president of the Hebrew University of Jerusalem.

== Biography ==
Leslie Avraham Harman was born in London in the United Kingdom. He received a law degree from Wadham College, Oxford in 1935. In 1938, he immigrated to Mandate Palestine.

Both Harman's wife Zina Harman and their daughter, Naomi Chazan were elected to the Knesset. He lived in Jerusalem till his death, and is buried in the city.

== Diplomatic and academic career ==
Following Israeli independence in 1948, he was appointed deputy director of the Press and Information Division of the Ministry of Foreign Affairs. In 1949, he was appointed Israel's first consul-general in Montreal, Quebec. In 1950, he worked in the Israeli delegation to the United Nations. From 1953 to 1955, he was the consul-general in New York, New York. From 1959 to 1968, he was Israel's ambassador to the United States.

While serving as ambassador, he remained in contact with Israeli Foreign Minister Abba Eban during the 1967 Six-Day War and the USS Liberty incident. Five days after the Liberty attack (while still in Washington D.C.), Harman cabled Eban (who was in Tel Aviv) that one of their sources was reporting that the Americans had "clear proof that from a certain stage the pilot discovered the identity of the ship and continued the attack anyway." Three days later, Harman repeated the warning to Eban that the White House was "very angry" and "the reason for this is that the Americans probably have findings showing that our pilots indeed knew that the ship was American."

From 1968 to 1983, he was the president of the Hebrew University of Jerusalem, following Eliahu Eilat and succeeded by Don Patinkin. As President, among other things, he was responsible for the rebuilding and expansion of the original campus of the Hebrew University on Mount Scopus. After 1983, he was appointed Chancellor.

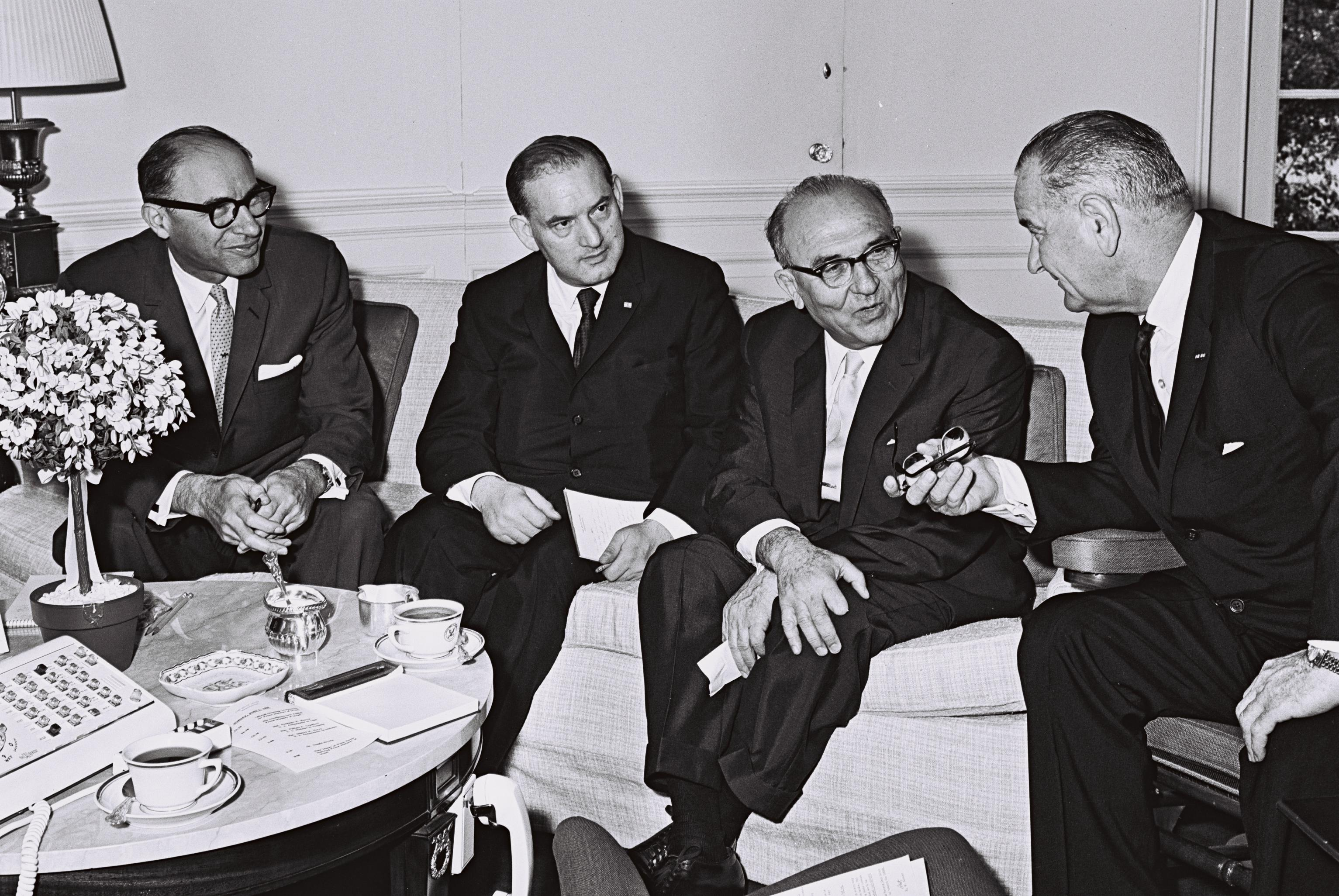
Harman meeting with Lyndon Johnson at the While House, 1964

Harman was founding president of the Israel Public Council for Soviet Jewry, a post he held until his death. He received honorary degrees from Yeshiva University, Brandeis University, the Hebrew University, the Weizmann Institute, New York University, Brooklyn College, the Jewish Theological Seminary, Hebrew Union College, Pepperdine University, University of San Francisco and University of Rochester. He was also named an honorary fellow by his alma mater, Wadham College, Oxford.

== Commemoration ==
The Avraham Harman Institute of Contemporary Jewry at the Hebrew University of Jerusalem is named in his honour.
