= George Harmon =

George Harmon may refer to:

- George Harmon (basketball) (1902–1954), American basketball player (Mercer Bears)
- George Harmon (footballer) (born 2000), English football player (Oxford City, Ross County)
- George M. Harmon (1837–1910), Connecticut Adjutant General
