= William Harman =

Irish cricketer

Personal information
- Full name: William Crooke Ronayne Harman
- Born: 28 May 1869; Crosshaven, Ireland
- Died: 4 July 1962 (aged 93); Cobh, Munster, Ireland
- Batting: Right-handed
- Relatives: George Harman (brother)

Domestic team information
- Years: Team
- 1907: Ireland

Career statistics
Competition	First-class
Matches	1
Runs scored	2
Batting average	1.00
100s/50s	–/–
Top score	2
Catches/stumpings	1/–
- Source: Cricinfo, 10 January 2022

William Crooke Ronayne Harman (29 May 1869 in County Cork, Ireland – 4 July 1962 in County Cork) was an Irish cricketer. He played just once for the Ireland cricket team, a first-class match against Yorkshire in May 1907. His brother George played first-class cricket for Dublin University, but was much more notable as an international rugby player for Ireland
