= Roberta Strauss Feuerlicht =

American historian

- Born: 23 November 1931; New York City
- Died: October 1991 (aged 59)
- Education: Hunter College
- Spouse: Herbert Alan Feuerlicht

Roberta Strauss Feuerlicht (23 Nov 1931 – Oct 1991) was an American author and historian.

== Biography ==
Born Roberta Strauss in New York City to Isaac and Lena (Wesler) Strauss, Feuerlicht attended Hunter College in New York City and received a bachelor's degree in 1952. Six years later, on December 14, 1958, she married Herbert Alan Feuerlicht, a sculptor. Together, they had one son.

Upon her graduation in 1952, Feuerlicht began work as an associate editor of the Glen Oaks News, and in 1953, she became an editor with the Gilberton Co. of New York City. She held this position until 1961, when she became the editorial director of This Month magazine. From 1962 onwards, she continued work as freelance writer and editor. She ultimately published 18 books, some of the best known of which are Joe McCarthy and McCarthyism: The Hate that Haunts America and her contentious anti-Zionist work The Fate of the Jews: A People Torn Between Israeli Power and Jewish Ethics.

== Selected publications ==
- The Desperate Act: The Assassination of Franz Ferdinand at Sarajevo (1968)
- Joe McCarthy and McCarthyism: The Hate that Haunts America (1972)
- The Fate of the Jews: A People Torn Between Israeli Power and Jewish Ethics (1983)
