= Ryan Holman =

Dutch footballer (born 1986)

Personal information
- Date of birth: 5 July 1986 (age 40)
- Place of birth: The Hague, Netherlands
- Position: Defender

Youth career
- DHC
- 1996–2005: Feyenoord

Senior career*
Years	Team	Apps	(Gls)
2005–2007	Willem II	1	(0)
2007–2008	Haarlem	5	(0)
2008–2011	Ter Leede		
2011–2012	Barendrecht	21	(1)
2012–2014	Ter Leede	15	(0)
2014–2016	GVVV	11	(0)
2016–2020	De Merino's		

International career
2001–2002	Netherlands U16	6	(0)
2002–2003	Netherlands U17	10	(0)
2004	Netherlands U18	1	(0)
- * Club domestic league appearances and goals

Ryan Holman (born 5 July 1986) is a Dutch retired footballer who played as a defender.

== Club career ==
Born in The Hague, Holman began his youth career with DHC Delft before joining the Feyenoord youth academy in 1996. Failing to break through to the first team, he joined Willem II, where he made his professional debut in the 2005–06 season. He afterwards played for HFC Haarlem, before focusing on his studies and playing amateur football in the lower tiers for Ter Leede, BVV Barendrecht and GVVV. In March 2020, he played his last football match as part of Tweede Klasse club De Merino's before retiring.

== International career ==
Holman played 6 games for the Netherlands national under-16 football team and 10 for the U17s.
