= George Harman =

Irish rugby union player and cricketer

George Richard Uniacke Harman (6 June 1874 – 14 December 1975) was an Irish cricketer and rugby union player.

Harman was born in Crosshaven, County Cork, Ireland. A right-handed batsman, he played one first-class match for Dublin University against the MCC in May 1895. He is one of only 22 first-class cricketers to live to the age of 100. He was much more successful as a Rugby Union player, representing Ireland twice in the 1899 Home Nations Championship, playing against England and Wales. His brother William Harman played one first-class match for Ireland in 1907. He died in Cornwall, England, in December 1975, aged 101.

== See also ==
- List of Irish cricket and rugby union players
