= Anna Harman =

Canadian engineer and consultant

- Born: 1994 (age 31–32); Ottawa, Ontario, Canada
- Education: Queen's University (B.A.Sc., Mechanical Engineering)
- Occupations: Engineer, Climate Change Consultant, Senior Advisor, Climate Activist
- Employer: Jones Lang LaSalle (JLL)
- Known for: Decarbonization strategy, carbon reduction in the built environment
- Height: 6 ft (183 cm)
- Awards: AEE Young Energy Professional of the Year (2021); 30 Under 30 Sustainability Leader
- Website: https://www.linkedin.com/in/annaharman?trk=contact-info

Anna Harman (born 1994) is a Canadian engineer, climate change consultant, and sustainability leader dedicated to reducing carbon emissions in the built environment. Recognized for her innovative approach to tackling climate challenges, she has been named one of Canada's 30 Under 30 Sustainability Leaders and was awarded the Young Energy Professional of the Year in 2021.

== Early life and education ==
Anna Harman was born and raised in Ottawa, Ontario. She attended Queen's University, where she graduated with a Bachelor of Applied Science in Mechanical Engineering. During her time at Queen's, she was an active member of the campus community, serving as co-chair of the Conference on Industry and Resources: Queen's University Engineering (CIRQUE) and playing for the Queen's Women's Varsity Volleyball Team as a middle blocker.

== Career ==
She also played a key role in developing some of the first decarbonization strategies for the Government of Canada. As a senior advisor for Decarbonization Strategy at JLL, she led a team of engineers and strategists working on real-estate decarbonization.

=== Professional activities ===
In 2017, Harman joined WSP Canada as a Climate Change Advisor and Project Manager. In this role, she led net-zero carbon plans and sustainability strategies for building portfolios, working on projects such as the National Portfolio Carbon Neutral Implementation Plan for Public Services and Procurement Canada (PSPC) and the Sustainable Development and Environmental Strategy Implementation Plan for Real Property Services (RPS Canada). Harman co-founded and chaired the WSP Ottawa Sustainability Committee and educated young students about engineering and climate change as part of the WSP Ottawa Gender Balance Committee.

She co-founded and leads the Council on Women in Energy & Environmental Leadership (CWEEL) as part of AEE Canada East, where she also serves as vice president.

=== Awards and recognition ===
Harman was named a 30 Under 30 Sustainability Leader and the 2021 Young Energy Professional of the Year by the Association of Energy Engineers.

She was awarded Volunteer Business Mentor Badge by OCSB Social Entrepreneurs Program in 2021.
