= Gene Hallman =

American sports businessman (born 1959)

- Born: circa 1960; South Carolina
- Occupation: Sports event management
- Years active: 1991 - current
- Known for: Organizing sporting events

Gene Hallman is a sports event entrepreneur. He is best known for his work developing sports tourism in Birmingham, Alabama. Hallman is the president and co-founder of sports event company Eventive Sports. He also is the CEO of Bruno Hospitality, ZOOM Motorsports, and the non-profit, Alabama Sports Council (formerly Alabama Sports Foundation). Hallman was born in South Carolina in 1960. In the early 1990s, he quit his job and moved to Birmingham, where he organized a Senior PGA Tour event. Over time, his sporting events business expanded to other sports and geographic areas.

== Early life and education ==
Hallman was born circa 1960 in Anderson, South Carolina. His family moved to Irmo, South Carolina when he was a child. Hallman graduated from Irmo High School. Hallman received his bachelor's degree in economics from the College of Charleston in 1982, then completed his MBA from the University of South Carolina in 1985.

== Career ==
Initially, Hallman worked for NCR Corporation. In 1990, Hallman quit his job and started working as a self-employed agent for golfers, such as the PGA Tour's Corey Pavin. He moved to Birmingham, Alabama, in November 1991 to be a director for a new tournament on the Senior PGA tour.

In 1995, when the Bruno's grocery chain was sold, former Bruno's CEO Ronald Bruno and Hallman co-founded the firm Bruno Event Team together. Over time, the business expanded to other sports, in addition to golf. It was largely a local business in Birmingham, until it started expanding in the early 2000s with events for the U.S. Women's Open. Bruno also organized the soccer matches at Legion Field for the 1996 Summer Olympics.

The Bruno Event Team became one of the largest sporting events management firms. Bruno sold his interest in the company in 2022, when he retired. The company was renamed to Eventive Sports, then was acquired by a company called Troon in 2024. In 2022, Hallman was awarded the Distinguished American Sportsman Award by the Alabama Sports Hall of Fame.
