= John Holeman =

John David Holeman (born 1963) is a professional surfer. Holeman was inducted into the East Coast Surfing Hall Of Fame on January 13, 2012, at the Orange County Convention Center in Orlando, Florida.

== Early life ==
Holeman was born in Washington, D.C., in 1963 and moved to Florida in 1967. He began surfing at age five.

== Surfing ==
Holeman advanced through the East Coast ranks and took many NSSA and Eastern Surfing Association (ESA) titles before he turned pro in 1984, receiving the rookie of the year award.

== Health issues ==
Holeman contracted a virus that damaged his heart after a bout of pneumonia in 2002. He received a pacemaker and defibrillator at age 39. He had a heart transplant in 2003.

== Coaching ==
He started John Holeman Surf School in Satellite Beach to coach other surfers. In August of 2021, Holeman renamed his surf school to Air360 Surf School. Holeman currently works with beginners to intermediate surfers. Holeman is now retired from surf coaching.
