= Justice Holman =

Justice Holman may refer to:

- James Holman (judge) (born 1947), judge of the High Court of England and Wales
- Jesse Lynch Holman (1784–1842), one of the first three justices of the Supreme Court of Indiana
- Lawrence Holman (1906–1989), associate justice of the Supreme Court of Missouri
- Ralph M. Holman (1914–2013), associate justice of the Oregon Supreme Court
