= Harman geared locomotive =

Australian steam locomotive

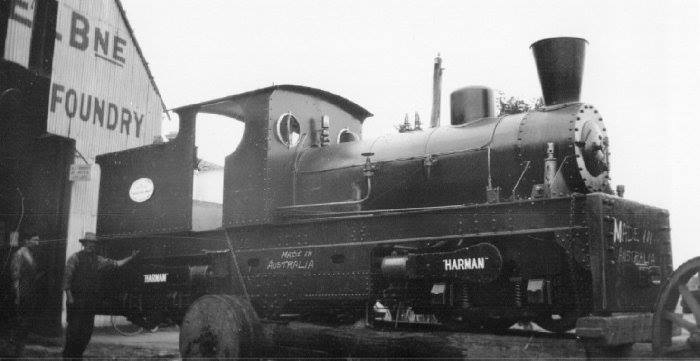
- Harman geared locomotive built for the Forests Commission Victoria in 1927
Type and origin
- Power type: Steam
- Designer: Alfred Harman from Melbourne
- Builder: Alfred Harman from Melbourne
Specifications
- Gauge: 2 ft 6 in gauge
- Driver dia.: 2 ft 4.5 in
- Wheelbase: Two four-wheel bogies, which were constructed with heavy side-plates, carrying the horn cheeks, steel axleboxes, end plates and a central steel casting, which supported the ball bearings of the transverse shafts of the reduction gear.
- Length
  - Over couplers: 26 ft
- Width: 5 ft 4 in
- Height: 10 ft
- Frame type: Rolled steel joists (12 in x 6 in x 54 lbs), boiler rigidly attached at the firebox and supported on a cradle at the smokebox end.
- Loco weight: Specified: 16 to 18 tons. Actual: 26 tons
- Water cap.: 270 gallons centred under the main frame
- Tender cap.: 200 gallons in the tender
- Boiler
  - Model: Messrs. Johnson & Son
  - Diameter: 2 ft 10 in
  - Tube plates: 6ft 6 in
- Boiler pressure: 200 psi
- Heating surface
  - Firebox: (4 ft 3 in x 2 ft 5 ft x 3 in) 45.2 sq. ft.
  - Tubes: 212.5 sq. ft
  - Total surface: 257.7 sq. ft.
- Cylinders: Each bogie was equipped with two cylinders, which operated crankshafts, running in ball bearings. The big ends were also fitted with ball bearings.
- Cylinder size: 6 in x 6 in
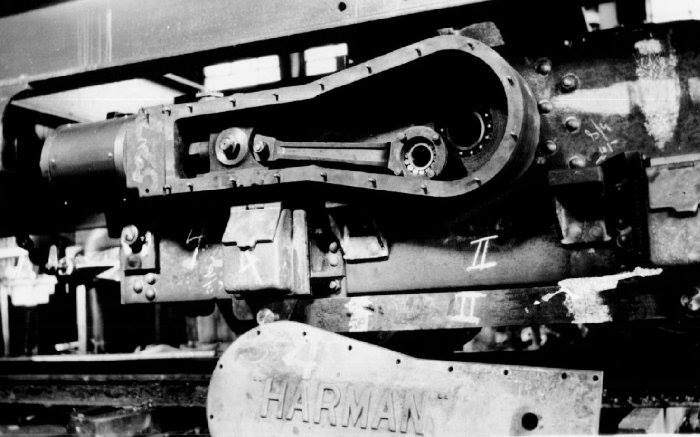
- Transmission: A steel spur gear on the transverse shaft provided the first reduction, the second being through the following chain and sprocket drive to the axles, the total providing a 4to1 ratio.
- Safety systems: A Cheney spark nullifier, by Cheney of Bayswater, Western Australia, was fitted to the stack to minimise the fire risk. The usual smokebox conditions did not exist, as exhaust steam, instead of entering a blast-pipe, was taken to the top of the smokestack and expelled through a slotted ring, to form a cone of saturated steam. This was an added fire prevention measure, as all products of combustion passed through this steam. The draught required was provided by the turbine furnace, with which the locomotive was fitted, an arrangement that brought the rate of combustion directly under the driver's control.
Performance figures
- Tractive effort: 9,374 lbs (less 10% due to gear losses, giving 8,887 lbs)
Career
- Delivered: 29 November 1927
- First run: 30 November 1927

The Harman geared locomotive was a geared steam locomotive by Alfred Harman from Melbourne in Australia.

== History ==
The Forests Commission Victoria (FCV) called a tender for a new geared steam locomotive up to 27 May 1927. The Melbourne-based company of Alfred Harman issued an offer, which the FCV was obliged to accept against its better judgement, as the only suitable alternatives were made in the USA. At that time, government policy favoured the purchase of locally made machines or if these were not available, machines made in the United Kingdom.

The design concept was based on the use of Harman's successful logging winches in the power bogies, but the large number of unproven design features resulted in several faults. Thus this engine had to be replaced in April 1928 by a ‘Class B’ Climax locomotive by the Climax Manufacturing Co., USA.

The locomotive was delivered at Moe by the Victorian Railways on 29 November 1927. It was off-loaded onto the Walhalla branch line. The following day it travelled under steam to Collins siding, in charge of a Victorian Railways crew. On arrival, it steamed over a temporary connection with the tramway and commenced the run to Tyers Junction.

During the problematic delivery run to Tyers Junction the engine derailed twice at 1m64c on an S-curve. The locomotive was rerailed and returned to Collins Siding, where weaker springs were installed to reduce the rigidity of the bogies. On 13 December 1927, the trip to Tyers Junction was made smoother by the use of grease on the outer rail at curves. Timber haulage commenced on 12 January 1928, after conducting modifications to the bogie masts.
