= Zina Harman =

Israeli politician & Chairman of UNICEF (1914–2013)

- זינה הרמן
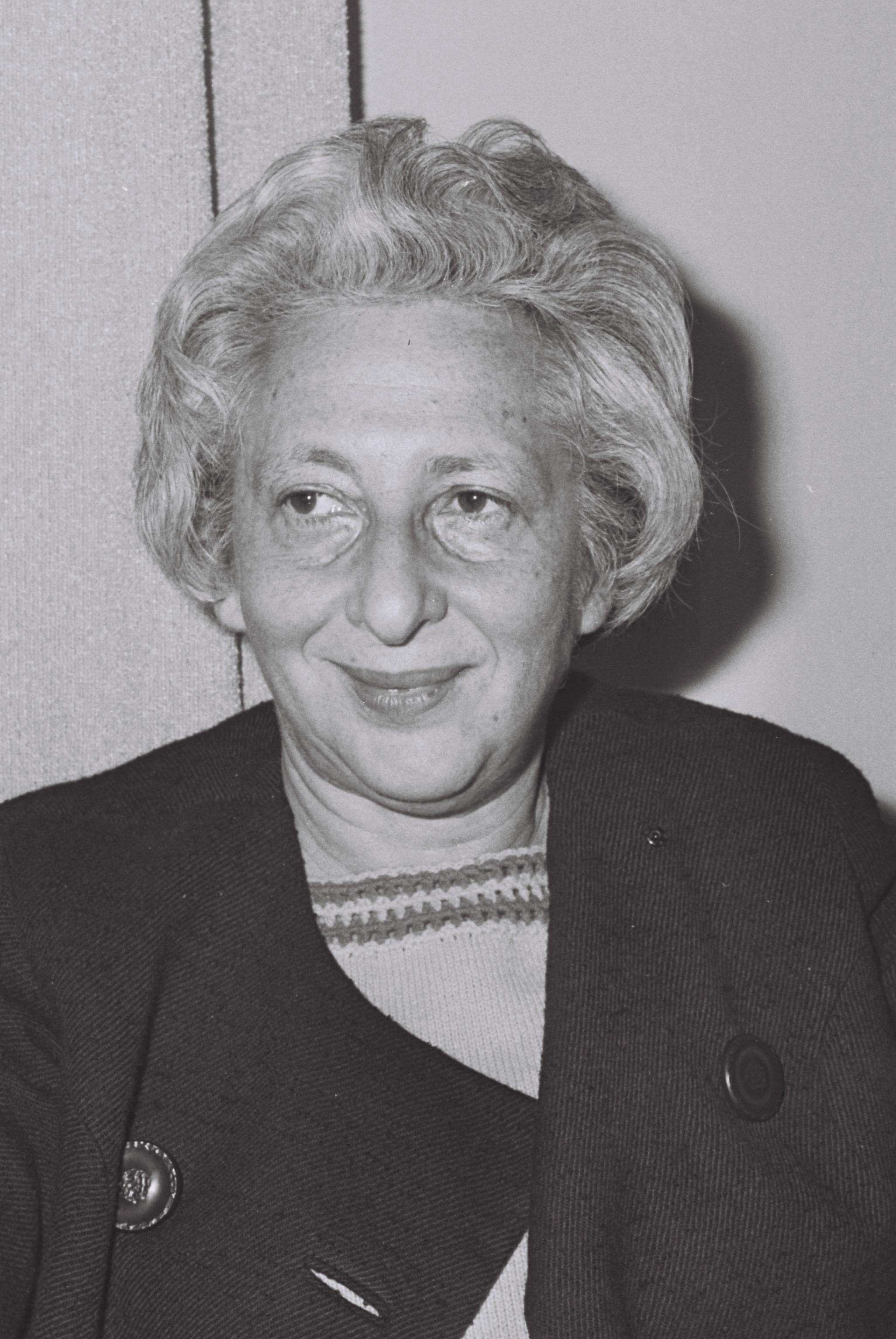
- Harman in 1970

Faction represented in the Knesset
- 1969–1974: Alignment

Personal details
- Born: 28 August 1914; London, United Kingdom
- Died: 21 January 2013 (aged 98)

Zina Harman (Hebrew: זינה הרמן, née Stern; 28 August 1914 – 21 January 2013) was an Israeli politician who served as a member of the Knesset for the Alignment between 1969 and 1974 and as Chairman of UNICEF from 1964 to 1966.

== Biography ==
Born in London in the United Kingdom, Harman studied at the London School of Economics before emigrating to Mandatory Palestine, where she was employed as a social worker in Jerusalem's Jewish Community Centre between 1941 and 1943. From 1943 until 1949, she worked in Youth Aliyah first as assistant to its head, Henrietta Szold, until her death and then in other positions. In 1951, she became a member of the Israeli delegation to the United Nations, where she worked until 1955. During that time, she was elected to the board of UNICEF as the Israel representative. She was elected chair of the Program Committee and then became chairman of the executive board from 1964 to 1966. In that latter capacity she accepted the Nobel Peace Prize awarded to UNICEF in 1965. From 1956 to 1957, she was deputy director of Technical Assistance in the prime minister's Office, before heading the Department of International Organizations in the Ministry of Foreign Affairs between 1957 and 1959. In 1959 she was appointed head of the National Centre for Demography and served on the prime minister's Commission on Social Policy and as vice-president of the International Council on Social Welfare and the International Commission on the Status of Women.

In 1969 she was elected to the Knesset on the alignment list and served for one term. Following her term in the Knesset, she founded and chaired the Jerusalem Council for the Welfare of Children and then served for 25 years as the Israel Representative of the United Nations Commission for Refugees.

Harman was married to Avraham Harman, an Israeli ambassador to the United States and President of the Hebrew University of Jerusalem. She has three children: Ilana, Director of the Internal Medicine Department at Soroka Hospital, Naomi Chazan, a professor of Political Science who also served as a member of the Knesset for Meretz and David, a professor of education. Her grandson, David's son Mishy Harman, co-created and hosts the podcast Israel Story.
