= Wollman =

Wollman is a surname. Notable people with the surname include:

- Élie Wollman (1917–2008), French microbial geneticist who first described plasmids
- Elisabeth Wollman (1888–1943), French microbiologist at the Pasteur Institute in Paris
- Francis-André Wollman (born 1953), French biologist
- Harvey L. Wollman (1935-2022), American politician, the 26th Governor of South Dakota
- Julie Wollman, American academic administrator
- Leo Wollman (1914–1998), New York doctor who assisted transsexuals with their transitions
- Roger Leland Wollman (born 1934), federal judge on the United States Court of Appeals for the Eighth Circuit
- Terry Wollman (born 1956), Billboard charting American Jazz/Pop musician

== See also ==
- Wollman Rink, public ice rink in the southern part of Central Park, Manhattan, New York City

- Hollman
- Hollmann
- Holman (disambiguation)
- Ohlman
- Owlman
- Ullman
- Wallimann
- Wallmann
- Wellman (disambiguation)
- Wellmann
- Welman
- Willeman
- Willman
- Willmann
- Wollamai
- Wolman
