= Wellman (surname) =

Wellman is an English surname. Notable people with the surname include:

- Arthur Holbrook Wellman (1855–1948), Massachusetts state senator
- Barry Wellman (1942-2024), American-Canadian sociologist
- Bela Wellman (1819–1887), California Gold Rush merchant and member of the San Francisco Vigilance Committee
- Brad Wellman (born 1959), American baseball player
- Dorothy Wellman (1913–2009), American actress and dancer
- Frederick Creighton Wellman (1873-1960), American entomologist and physician
- Frederick Lovejoy Wellman (1897-1994), American plant pathologist, son of Frederick Creighton Wellman
- Gary Wellman (born 1967), American football player
- Harold Wellman (1909–1999), New Zealand geologist
- Harry R. Wellman (1899–1997), president of the University of California
- Ken Wellman (1930–2013), Australian ice hockey player
- Mac Wellman (born 1945), American playwright
- Manly Wade Wellman (1903–1986), American writer of fiction and non-fiction, son of Frederick Creighton Wellman
- Michael Wellman (born 1961), American computer scientist
- Mike Wellman (born 1956), American football player
- Paul Wellman (1895-1966), American journalist, screenwriter and author, son of Frederick Creighton Wellman
- Phillip Wellman (born 1961), American minor league baseball manager
- Samuel T. Wellman (1847–1919), American industrialist, steel magnate, and inventor
- Thomas Wellman (1615–1672), Puritan colonist of the Massachusetts Bay Colony
- Walter Wellman (1858–1934), American journalist, explorer, and aëronaut
- William A. Wellman (1896–1975), American film director
- William Wellman Jr. (born 1937), American actor

== See also ==
- Wellmann
