= Frederick Wellman =

Frederick Wellman may refer to:

- Frederick Creighton Wellman (1873–1960), American entomologist and physician
- Frederick Lovejoy Wellman (1897–1994), American plant pathologist, son of Frederick Creighton Wellman
- Fred Wellman (Frederick Paul Wellman, born 1965), retired U.S. Army officer and U.S. Representative-elect for the 2nd District of Missouri

== See also ==
- Wellmann
