= Mariangela =

Mariangela is a given name. Notable people with the given name include:

- Mariangela Bonanni (born 1988), Venezuelan beauty pageant titleholder and fashion model
- Mariangela Demurtas (born 1981), Italian singer in the gothic metal band Tristania
- Mariangela Giordano (1937–2011), Italian film and television actress
- Mariangela Lisanti (born 1983), American theoretical physicist and associate professor
- Mariangela Melato (born 1941), Italian actress
- Mariangela Parravicini (born 1986), Italian freestyle skier
- Mariangela Perrupato (born 1988), Italian synchronized swimmer
- Mariangela Piancastelli (born 1953), Italian basketball player
- Mariangela Pino (born 1953), American actress
- Mariangela Soleil Frias Trinidad or Panky Trinidad, Filipina singer
- Mariangela Vacatello (born 1982), Italian classical concert pianist
- Mariangela Wallimann-Bornatico (born 1948), Swiss jurist
- Mariangela Zappia (born 1959), Italian diplomat

== See also ==
- 55112 Mariangela (2001 QQ153), a Main-belt Asteroid discovered in 2001
- Mariana (disambiguation)
- Marianela (disambiguation)
