= Wellman =

Wellman may refer to:

- Wellman (film), a 2003 Croatian documentary film about a well excavator
- Wellman House, a historic site in Friendship, New York

== Cities and communities ==
- Wellman, Iowa, a city in Washington County, Iowa, near Iowa City
- Wellman, Ohio, an unincorporated community in Warren County
- Wellman, Texas, a city in Terry County

== Other uses ==
- Wellman (surname)

== See also ==
- Wellmann
