= Canda (automobile company) =

Defunct American motor vehicle manufacturer

The Canda Manufacturing Company, based in Carteret, New Jersey, produced cars from 1900 through 1902.

== History ==
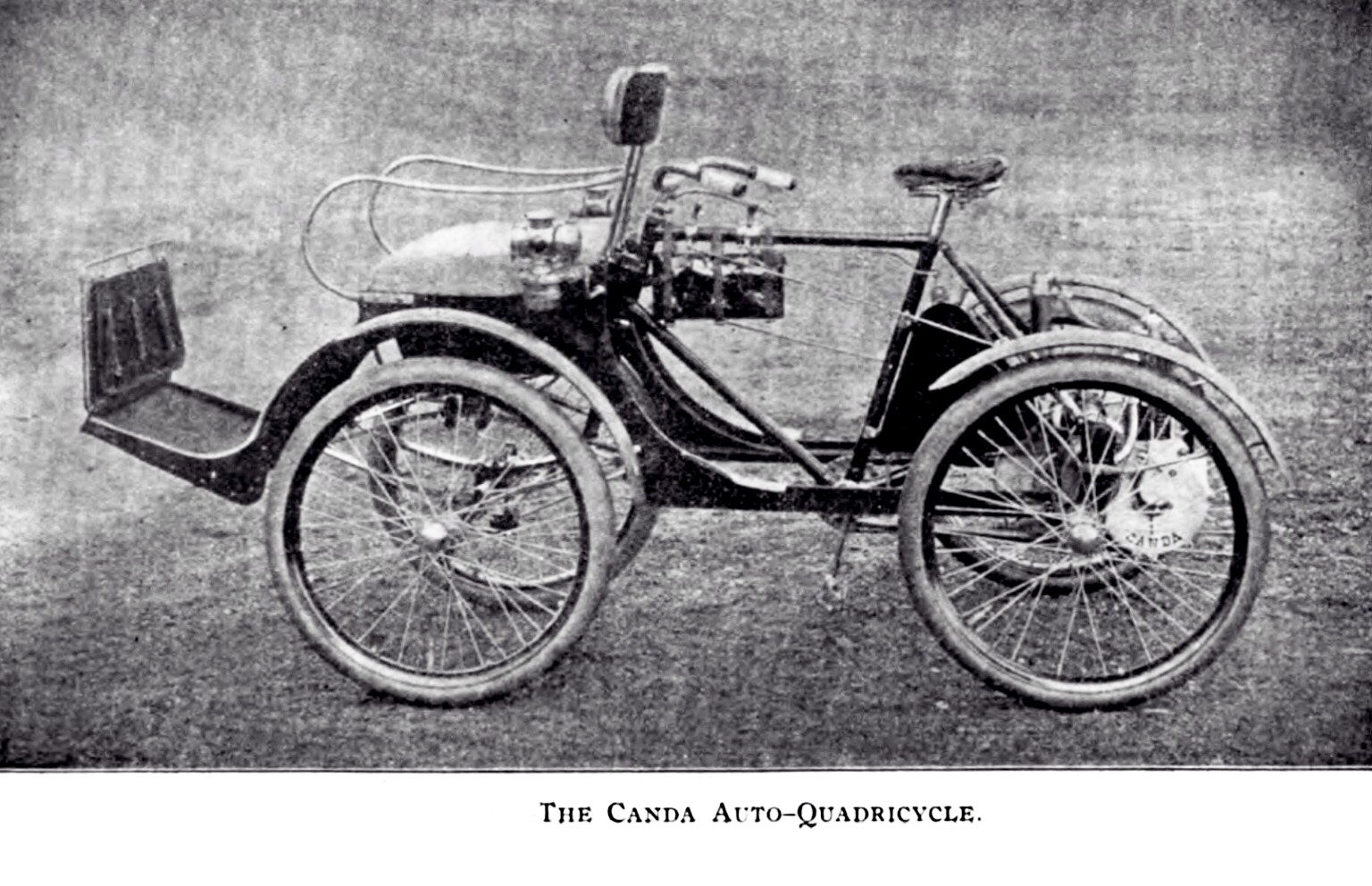
Canda Auto-Quadricycle (1900-1902).

The company was originally founded in 1896 as a producer of railroad hand cars.

It started in the automobile business when it acquired the rights to produce the gasoline engine invented by the Duryea brothers. At first Canda produced these engines for the Duryeas, but the deal fell through when Charles Duryea (who, in the deal, was superintendent of the factory) left to pursue his own ventures.

In 1900, the company decided to make their own cars, starting with the Auto-Quadricycle, which was powered by an Otto type 1¾ hp engine. It included a bell and lamps. However, in the summer 1902, the company folded, with its remaining stock being acquired by a man named George Condon of Newark.

== Models ==
Car	Engine	Horsepower	Wheelbase(inches)
Auto-Quadricycle	One-Cylinder	1¾	46
Auto-Quadricycle van	One-Cylinder	1¾	46
Auto-Tricycle	One-Cylinder	1¾	46
Spider Runabout	Two-Cylinder	5	50
Stanhope	Two-Cylinder	5	54
