= Dugald Clerk =

Scottish engineer (1854–1932)

Sir Dugald Clerk
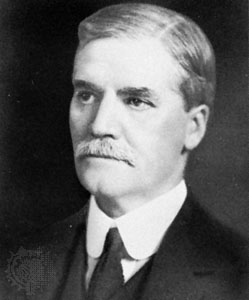
- Born: 31 March 1854; Glasgow, Scotland, UK
- Died: 12 November 1932 (aged 78); Ewhurst, England, UK
- Citizenship: British
- Occupation: Engineer
- Known for: Designed the world's first successful two-stroke engine

Sir Dugald Clerk (sometimes written as Dugald Clark) KBE, LLD FRS (1854, Glasgow – 1932, Ewhurst, Surrey) was a Scottish engineer who designed the world's first successful two-stroke engine in 1878 and patented it in England in 1881. He was a graduate of Anderson's University in Glasgow (now the University of Strathclyde), and Yorkshire College, Leeds (now the University of Leeds). He formed the intellectual property firm with George Croydon Marks, called Marks & Clerk. He was knighted on 24 August 1917.

== Life ==
Dugald Clerk was born in Glasgow on 31 March 1854, the son of Donald Clerk a machinist and his wife, Martha Symington. He was privately tutored then apprenticed to the firm of Messrs H O Robinson & Co in Glasgow. From 1871 to 1876 he went to Anderson College in Glasgow studying engineering then to the Yorkshire College of Science in Leeds. In the First World War he was Director of Engineering Research for the Admiralty.

He married Margaret Hanney in 1883.

He died in Ewhurst, Surrey on 12 November 1932.

== Clerk's work on the internal combustion engine ==
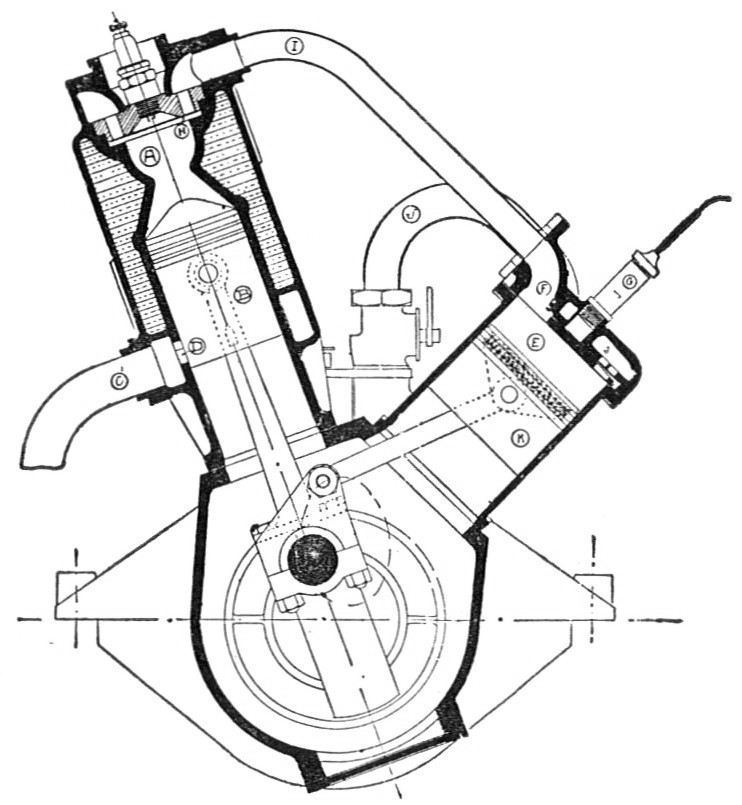
Sir Dugald Clerk's two-cycle engine

Clerk began work on his own engine designs in October 1878 after modifying a Brayton engine with a spark plug. Brayton engines (called "Ready Motors" were made from 1872 to 1876) and were one of the first engines to successfully use compression and combust fuel in the cylinder. Prior to this time the commercial engines available had been the Lenoir engine from 1860, a non-compression engine which worked on a double-acting two-stroke cycle, but spent half of each stroke drawing gas into the cylinder. The Hugon engine was a slightly improved version, but both were quite inefficient (95 and 85 cubic feet of gas per HP hour respectively). The next commercial engine available (from 1867) was the Otto & Langen a non compression, free piston engine, which used atmospheric pressure for the power stroke, and consumed about half the gas of the Lenoir and Hugon engines. It was in May 1876 that Otto developed his engine using the single-acting four-stroke cycle with compression in the cylinder. Clerk decided to develop an engine using compression, but with the two-stroke cycle, as he could see benefit to weight and smoothness of operation through having twice as many power strokes.

"Clerk's initial experiment with a Brayton ready motor in 1878 led him to make improvements that would eventually result in the development of the two-stroke cycle. Clerks engine used compression and a novel system of ignition", one of these was exhibited in July 1879. However it was not until the end of 1880 that he succeeded in producing the Clerk engine operating on the two-stroke cycle, which became the commercial product. Clerk states "The Clerk engine at present in the market was the first to succeed in introducing compression of this type, combined with ignition at every revolution; many attempts had previously been made by other inventors, including Mr. Otto and the Messrs. Crossley, but all had failed in producing a marketable engine. It is only recently that the Messrs. Crossley have made the Otto engine in its twin form and so succeeded in getting impulse at every turn."

Dugald Clerk was the author of three comprehensive books covering the development of the oil and gas engine from its early inception, and including details of his own work in this area. The first edition was produced in 1886, and the notes here are taken from the 7th edition, revised and updated up to 1896. In "Gas and Oil Engines", Clerk refers to the significant earlier gas engine patents of Barnett in 1838 and Wright in 1833.

== Clerk cycle ==
In 1878 Clerk obtained a Brayton "Ready Motor" engine made from 1872 to 1876 by George Brayton in Philadelphia, Pennsylvania, US. Clerk wondered if he could improve the performance of the engine. He soon outfitted the engine with a spark plug and an improved fuel system. Initially Clerk used one cylinder for compression and the other for expansion. At one point an explosion occurred which broke the engine in two pieces. The engine was repaired and displayed in 1879. Later Clerk decided to abandon use of the pumping cylinder for compression and use it only to transfer the air / fuel mixture into the power cylinder.

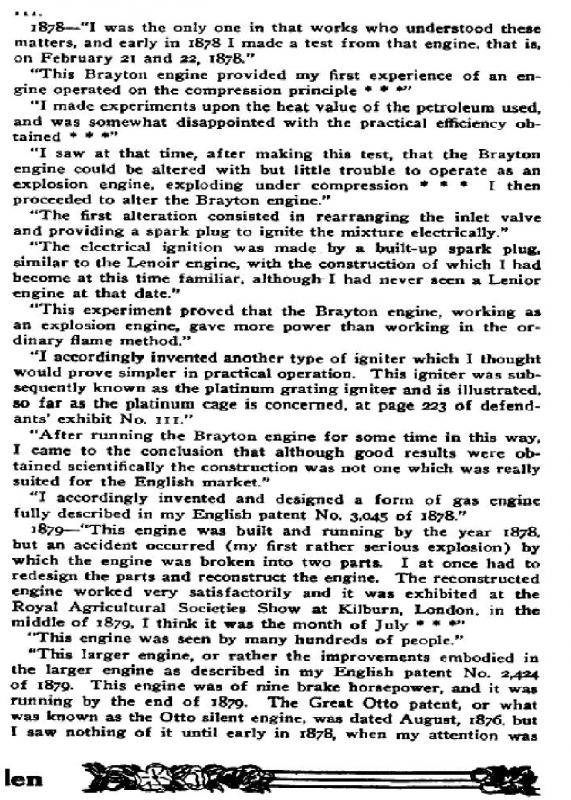
Clerk describes his experiments with the Brayton engine 1878

The Otto cycle was patented in 1876, immediately recognised to have a significant practical value. Clerk quickly followed with his concept of a two-stroke engine of 1880, that would not infringe the Otto's patent (being a four-stroke engine).

Clerk describes a Cambell engine as using his cycle, as follows: "It has two cylinders, respectively pump and motor, driven from cranks placed at almost right angles to each other, the pump crank leading. The pump takes in a charge of gas and air, and the motor piston overruns a port in the side of the cylinder at the out-end of its stroke to discharge the exhaust gases. When the pressure in the motor cylinder has fallen to atmosphere, the pump forces its charge into the back cover of the motor cylinder through a check valve, displacing before it the products of combustion through an exhaust port; the motor piston then returns, compressing the contents of the cylinder into the compression space. The charge is then fired and the piston performs its working stroke. This is the Clerk cycle."

The Clerk engine uses automatic 'poppet' type valves for inlet air and gas (one with spring assistance, one without), and a port in the cylinder uncovered by the piston for the exhaust valve. References to a Clerk engine with slide valve may refer to the earlier experiments with a Lenoir type engine. The ignition is by carrying an external flame, using a modification of a method he developed in 1878.

Most engine designs that pre-dated the Otto engine (and Clerk engine), such as those of de Rivaz, the Niépce brothers, Jean Joseph Etienne Lenoir, Samuel Morey, and others, did use two-stroke engines, which were "natural" in the times of steam engine. Clerk's significant contribution was introducing Otto-styled compression to the two-stroke engine, bringing its efficiency up to date (for the 1880s). Several manufacturers adopted the Clerk cycle in the short term, though commercial aspects such as patents on the four-stroke cycle were part of this. Many years later the two-stroke engine for large capacity diesels using a turbocharger or supercharger has become common, for example in ships and railway locomotives. With open crankshafts, and the advantages of higher power to weight ratio, these engines are closely aligned with Dugald Clerk's concepts, and the Clerk Cycle.

=== Pumping cylinder vs supercharger ===
Clerk's engine was made of two cylinders – one working cylinder and an additional cylinder to charge the cylinder, expelling the exhaust through a port uncovered by the piston. Some sources consider this additional cylinder the world's first supercharger. Clerk himself states that "It is not a compressing pump, and is not intended to compress before introduction into the motor, but merely to exercise force enough to pass the gases through the lift valve into the motor cylinder, and there displace the burnt gases, discharging them into the exhaust pipe." Hence sources recognise it instead as a "pumping cylinder", pointing out that it did not actually compress the fuel-air mixture, it simply moved the fresh mixture to the working cylinder to force out the gasses burnt previously.

=== Clerk's engine vs modern two-stroke engine ===
Clerk's original design did not allow the construction of smaller engines, as it required the aforementioned additional pumping cylinder for each working cylinder. The crucial simplification of the concept, that made possible small yet powerful two-stroke engines for mass markets, was patented by Joseph Day in 1894.

- Joseph Day, design of a three-port two-stroke engine
- Nash, design of a two-port two-stroke engine
- Robson, design of a two-stroke engine with under-piston scavenge
- Fielding, design of a uniflow two-stroke engine

== Arms ==
Coat of arms of Dugald Clerk
Motto Fortiter Ubique

== See also ==
- Joseph Day
- John Fleming (1 June 2000). The Complete Guide To Diesel Marine Engines. Bristol Fashion Publications. ISBN 1-892216-24-8.
- History of the internal combustion engine

== Bibliography ==
- Clerk, Dugald (1882). The Theory of the Gas Engine. New York: D. Van Nostrand.
- Clerk, Dugald (1886). The Gas and Oil Engine. London: Longman, Green & Co.
