= Senator Wellman =

Senator Wellman may refer to:

- Abijah J. Wellman (1836–1889), New York State Senate
- Arthur Holbrook Wellman (1855–1948), Massachusetts State Senate
