= Evelyn Scott (writer) =

American novelist and playwright

- Born: Elise Dunn; January 17, 1893; Clarksville, Tennessee
- Died: August 3, 1963 (aged 70)
- Spouse(s): Frederick Creighton Wellman (1913–1928); John Metcalfe (1930-1963)

Evelyn Scott (born Elsie Dunn, January 17, 1893 – August 3, 1963) was an American novelist, playwright and poet. A modernist and experimental writer, she "was a significant literary figure in the 1920s and 1930s, but she eventually sank into critical oblivion".

== Personal life ==
Dunn was born in Clarksville, Tennessee, and spent her younger years in New Orleans, Louisiana. She wrote about her childhood in her autobiographical Background in Tennessee.

Dunn's first husband was Frederick Creighton Wellman. He was a married man when they met and dean of the School of Tropical Medicine at Tulane. Both took on pseudonyms when they ran away to Brazil together in 1913. He became Cyril Kay-Scott and she took Scott as her surname. The two had a son, Creighton, before divorcing in 1928. She also had an affair with Owen Merton, father of Thomas Merton.

Scott married the English writer John Metcalfe, with whom she led a life of financial want and psychological instability, in 1930.

== Literary career ==
Scott sometimes wrote under the pseudonym Ernest Souza or under her birth name, Elsie Dunn.

== Bibliography ==
=== Fiction ===
- The Narrow House. New York: Boni & Liveright, 1921
- Narcissus. New York: Harcourt Brace, 1922 (U.K. edition: Bewilderment. London: Duckworth, 1922)
- The Golden Door. New York: Thomas Seltzer, 1925
- Ideals: a Book of Farce and Comedy. New York: Boni & Liveright, 1927
- Migrations: an Arabesque in Histories. New York: Boni & Liveright, 1927
- The Wave. New York: Jonathan Cape & Harrison Smith, 1929
- Blue Rum (written under the pseudonym "Ernest Souza"). New York: Jonathan Cape & Harrison Smith, 1930
- A Calendar of Sin: American Melodramas. New York: Jonathan Cape & Harrison Smith, 1931
- Eva Gay. New York: Harrison Smith & Robert Haas, 1933
- Breathe Upon These Slain. New York: Scribners, 1934
- Bread and a Sword. New York: Scribners, 1937
- The Shadow of the Hawk. New York: Scribners, 1941

=== Poetry ===
- Precipitations. New York: Nicholas L. Brown, 1920
- The Winter Alone. New York: Jonathan Cape & Harrison Smith, 1930
- The Collected Poems of Evelyn Scott (ed. Caroline C. Maun). Orono: National Poetry Foundation, University of Maine, 2005

=== Autobiography ===
- Escapade. New York: Thomas Seltzer, 1923
- Background in Tennessee. New York: R. M. McBride, 1937

=== Children's ===
- In the Endless Sands: a Christmas Book for Boys and Girls (with C. Kay-Scott). New York: Henry Holt & Co., 1925
- Witch Perkins: a Story of the Kentucky Hills. New York: Henry Holt & Co., 1929
- Billy the Maverick. New York: Henry Holt & Co., 1934
