= Frederick Creighton Wellman =

American entomologist

Frederick Creighton Wellman (January 3, 1873, near Kansas City, Missouri – September 3, 1960, Chapel Hill, North Carolina) was an American physician specialising in tropical medicine, scientist, author, playwright, teacher, artist and engineer. As an author, he wrote under the pseudonyms Cyril Kay-Scott and Richard Irving Carson. His colorful life led to the epithet "the Casanova of Tropical Medicine".

== Early life and education ==
Frederick Creighton Wellman was born on January 3, 1873, in Independence, Missouri, his father was Wheeler Montgomery Wellman and his mother was Nellie Jane, née Blake. He attended the Central High School, Kansas City before going on to study medicine at the Medical Department, University of Kansas, Kansas City in 1894, conducting his clinical studies at Rush and Cook County hospitals in Chicago. He also studied natural science and social science at the University of Chicago before moving to England to study clinical pathology at various hospitals, and tropical medicine and hygiene at the London School of Tropical Medicine, where he achieved a diploma in 1904. He also appears to have studied at the Chicago Theological Seminary for a Bachelor of Divinity degree with a thesis entitled Physical obstacles to evangelization, which was completed in 1895.

== Portuguese West Africa and Tulane ==
In 1896 he took up a post in Portuguese West Africa as a medical missionary for a British charity, travelling there with his first wife, Lydia Jeanette Isely (1869-1948). He remained for nine years. During his time in Portuguese West Africa he was said to have "gone native", to the horror of the missionaries he was working alongside.

In 1907 Wellman was involved, as a scientist, in the exploration of the route of the Benguela railway. In Africa he undertook research, publishing many papers and he had a correspondence with the American Society of Tropical Medicine.

After leaving Africa, he returned to London, where he studied entomology, and soon he had gained some renown in that field. From 1909-1911 he was a professor of tropical medicine at the Oakland (California) College of Medicine.

By 1911 Lydia and Wellman, who by now had four children, were divorced. He married his second wife, the concert pianist Edna Willis, at Buffalo, New York in 1908. He also travelled to Honduras in 1912, where he met and befriended Seely Dunn, a railroad engineer who was constructing a railroad in that country for the United Fruit Company. That year he published a paper entitled The New Orleans School of Tropical Medicine and Hygiene in the American Journal of Epidemiology under the name "Dr Creighton Wellman"; this paper set out a plan for the creation of a new independent school of public health. Wellman had been appointed chair of tropical medicine and hygiene at Tulane in 1911. The founding of a school of tropical medicine and hygiene at Tulane was largely funded by the American Society of Tropical Medicine and it was largely funded by a donation of US$25,000 by the businessman Samuel Zemurray. However, Wellman unexpectedly departed this post on December 26, 1913, when he suddenly eloped with the then-20-year-old Elsie Dunn, the daughter of his friend from Honduras, Seely Dunn. The couple moved to New York City, where they adopted the aliases of Cyril Kay-Scott and Evelyn Scott.

Wellman was editor of the American Journal of Tropical Diseases and Preventive Medicine from 1913 to 1915.

== Brazil ==
As Elsie was a minor, and Wellman had travelled over state lines with her, the Dunns reported him to the police, so soon after they got to New York, they fled to London, living for a time in Bloomsbury as husband and wife. At some point Wellman realized that they were about to be recognized, and he was able to persuade the British Museum to send him to South America to collect insect specimens. The couple took a steamer from Southampton to Rio de Janeiro. However, he was unable to fulfil his commitment to the Museum, as it would give his identity away. Wellman was able to obtain a position as a bookkeeper at a shop selling Singer Sewing Machines. While in Brazil they lived in poverty, staying for six years, and while there Elsie gave birth to their son Creighton Scott. This period is recounted in Escapade, a memoir Elsie wrote under her pseudonym of Evelyn Scott.

While in Brazil Wellman completed the manuscript of his novel Blind Mice, which was not published until 1921. At the shop, helped by his ability to speak Portuguese and his reporting of the manager's embezzlement, he gained promotion to auditor and then to superintendent, which meant that the couple were able to move to Natal, where Creighton “Jigg” Scott was born on October 26, 1914. Maud Dunn, Elsie's mother, had by this time arrived in Brazil on a one-way ticket paid for by Seely Dunn, who then divorced Maud for desertion. The family, now including Elsie's mother, relocated to a sheep ranch located in an isolated rural area, where the couple both began to compose poems and prose for publication at home in the United States. They abandoned the ranch in 1917 to move to Villa Nova, where Wellman had gained a position in a manganese prospecting with the International Ore Corporation, and in 1919 they went back to New York to get medical treatment for Elsie.

== Career as an artist ==
As the Scotts, they lived in Greenwich Village for two years, where they were able to interact with other writers. "Cyril" and "Evelyn" maintained their writing, but the relationship was in difficulties, and the couple separated.

Wellman's novels were critically acclaimed, but they were not commercially successful, and he found himself in some debt and, to try and improve his situation, he tried to reconcile with Evelyn. In 1922, the couple were living in Bermuda and were hosts to the artist Owen Merton, who encouraged Wellman to take up watercolors, while at the same time carrying on an affair with Evelyn.

The following year the couple toured Europe, but became more estranged. In Paris, Wellman studied art and lived as a successful artist, embarking on an affair with a woman known as Madame Elise, which ended when his lover suddenly died. Wellman then returned to America with his son Creighton to legally dissolve their common-law marriage relationship with Evelyn; he achieved this through some form of divorce proceedings in Chihuahua, Mexico in 1928. However the two remained close, and Wellman wrote admiringly of her in his autobiography.

He began to work as an art teacher, establishing an art school in Santa Fe, New Mexico, which was taken over by the University of Denver as a summer school in 1931, and he was appointed as director of the Denver Art Museum, going on to become the Dean of the College of Fine Arts at the University of Denver, a position he held until at least 1934. While he was in Santa Fe he married the children's author Phyllis Crawford, who was then a writer for the New Yorker Magazine. They were divorced in 1931.

== Later life ==
Wellman worked for a while on a project for the New Deal era Works Progress Administration with Creighton before he finally retired. In 1943 he published his first autobiography Life is Too Short, which was dedicated to his children and grandchildren. He died in Chapel Hill, North Carolina, on September 3, 1960. His colorful private life, involving no less than four marriages and one elopement, has led to him being dubbed the "Casanova of tropical medicine".

== Family ==
He married at least four times, if the apparently common law relationship with Evelyn Scott is included. With his first wife, Lydia, he had four children. Two of his sons with Lydia, Paul Wellman and Manly Wade Wellman, were notable authors, the other, Frederick Lovejoy Wellman, became a respected phytopathologist, and their daughter Alice Wellman Harris was also an author of children's books and theater director and producer. He had one child with Evelyn Scott, Creighton "Jigg" Scott (1914-1965). Wellman was one of the few people to gain the distinction of being listed in the American Who's Who under two names, Frederick Creighton Wellman and Cyril Kay-Scott. At some point he did legally change his name to Cyril Kay-Scott.

== Bibliography ==
As Cyril Kay Scott, Wellman published the following books:

- Blind Mice George H. Doran Company, New York, c. 1921 (321pp)
- Sinbad a romance Thomas Seltzer, New York, 1923 (282pp)
- Siren Faber & Gwyer, London, 1925 (287pp)
- Life is too short J.B. Lippincott Company, Philadelphia & New York, 1943

== Taxon named in his honor ==
- Enteromius wellmani (Boulenger, 1911) is a species of ray-finned fish in the genus Enteromius which is only found in the upper reaches of the Cuvo River system in Angola. Wellman collected the holotype specimen.
