= Hello the Boat! =

Novel by Phyllis Crawford

- Author: Phyllis Crawford
- Illustrator: Edward Laning
- Language: English
- Genre: Children's literature
- Publisher: Holt
- Publication date: 1938
- Publication place: United States

Hello the Boat! is a 1938 children's historical novel written by Phyllis Crawford and illustrated by Edward Laning. Set in 1817, it follows the journey of the Doak family, Mr. and Mrs. Doak, and their children Susan, Steven, and David, as they travel down the Ohio River from Pittsburgh, Pennsylvania to resettle in Cincinnati, Ohio and become farmers.

== Reception ==
The novel received a Newbery Honor in 1939, and the New York Times review applauded Crawford's characterizations and dialogue.
