= Glory, God and Gold =

1954 narrative history book by Paul Wellman

Glory, God and Gold is a narrative history by Paul Wellman, published in 1954. The title refers to motivations for the conquest of the New World. As such, they served the tendency toward imperialism, according to Gaylord.
