= Wolman =

Wolman and Wohlman is a surname. Notable people with the surname include:

- Abel Wolman (1892–1989), American inventor, scientist, professor, and pioneer of modern sanitary engineering
- Al Wohlman, film and theatre actor, vaudeville performer
- Amnon Wolman (born 1955), Israeli-American musician
- Baron Wolman (1937–2020), American photographer best known for his work for the music magazine Rolling Stone
- Benjamin Wolman (1908-2000), Polish-American psychologist and writer
- Dan Wolman (born 1941), Israeli film director
- David Wolman, American author and journalist
- Gil J. Wolman (1929–1995), French artist
- Harriet Wolman, Canadian politician
- Jerry Wolman (1927–2013), Washington, D.C. developer and the owner of the Philadelphia Eagles football team
- Leo Wolman (1890–1961), American economist whose work focused on labor economics
- M. Gordon Wolman (1924–2010), American geographer
- Moshe Wolman (1914–2009), Israeli neuropathologist
- Richard Woleman or Wolman (ob. 1537), English churchman and courtier
- William Wolman (1927–2011), longtime chief economist at BusinessWeek magazine, and a frequent commentator on CNBC
- Zachary Wohlman (1988–2021), American professional boxer

== See also ==
- Wolman disease, rare genetic disorder caused by a deficiency of an enzyme known as lysosomal acid lipase (LAL or LIPA)
- Wolman salts, wood preservative containing arsenic
