= Wallimann =

Wallimann is a surname. Notable people with the surname include:

- David Wallimann, musician in the American progressive rock group Glass Hammer
- Theo Wallimann (born 1946), Swiss cell biologist
- Mariangela Wallimann-Bornatico (born 1948), former Secretary-General of the Swiss Federal Assembly
