= Thomas Wellman =

- Born: circa 1615; England
- Died: 10 October 1672; Lynn, Massachusetts
- Spouse: Elizabeth (----)
- Children: Abraham Wellman; Isaac Wellman; Elizabeth Wellman; Sarah Wellman; Mary Wellman

Thomas Wellman was born in about 1615 in England and died at Lynn, Massachusetts on 10 October 1672. He was among the early settlers of the Massachusetts Bay Colony and progenitor of the Wellman family of New England. At age 21 he traveled from London to Barbados in 1634 or 1635 aboard Hopewell as part of a mass exodus of Puritans called the Great Migration.

== New life in America ==
Thomas sailed from Barbados to Massachusetts and settled in Lynn about 1640, where he married Elizabeth (whose family surname has not been discovered) about 1642. At the time of his death, he owned 180 acres of land in Lynn. Their home on the east side of Summer Street in Lynn was occupied by several generations of Wellmans before being demolished in the 1830s.

== Second generation of Thomas Wellman's family ==
Thomas Wellman and his wife Elizabeth had five children: Abraham (born about 1643-died about 1717), Isaac (born about 1647-died after 1724), Elizabeth (born about 1660-died 1740), Sarah (born about 1662), and Mary (born about 1664).

- Abraham married Elizabeth Cogswell (born about 1648-died 1736) about 1668. She was the daughter of John Cogswell of Ipswich, Massachusetts. Abraham inherited half of his father's land and the family home. Abraham and his wife Elizabeth made grand jury depositions concerning Sarah Cole of Lynn during the Salem witch trials. Abraham and his wife Elizabeth had eight children:
  - Thomas (11 October 1669-died about 1735) six children.
  - Elizabeth (16 February 1671 – 24 April 1673)
  - Abraham (25 November 1673-died at sea after 26 October 1745) seven children.
  - John (3 May 1676-died young)
  - Elizabeth (born 25 July 1678) married three times.
  - Abigail (died 1737 or 1738)
  - Mary (died 1737) married Caleb Coye. 2 children.
  - Martha became the 2nd wife of her 1st cousin Ebeneezer.
- Isaac married Hannah Adams (born January 1662 or 1663-died after May 1711) 13 March 1678 or 1679. She was the youngest daughter of Richard and Elizabeth Adams of Malden, Massachusetts. Issac inherited half of his father's land. Isaac was a soldier in King Philip's War and participated in the capture of Fort Narraganset on 19 December 1675. His heirs were among the grantees of Narraganset No. 2 (Westminster) in 1733. Isaac made a grand jury deposition concerning Sarah Cole during the Salem witch trials. Isaac and his wife Hannah had eleven children:
  - Isaac (7 February 1679 – 19 September 1681)
  - Stephen (6 September 1681 – 21 January 1767) six children.
  - Hannah (born about 1683) the last record of Hannah was dated 1706.
  - Sarah (born about 1685) married John Hall 7 March 1726 or 1727.
  - Isaac (born about 1687-1740) five children.
  - Ebeneezer (born about 1690) seven children.
  - Joseph (born about 1693-died after 10 July 1770) twelve children.
  - Timothy (born about 1696-5 February 1787) six children.
  - Samuel (born about 1699-died before 20 July 1770) five children.
  - Benjamin (born about 1702-died 1782) never married.
  - Adam (born about 1705-1766) no children.
- Elizabeth married George Hull (born about 1650-died about April 1742) of Beverly, Massachusetts.
- The last record of Sarah was dated 22 October 1684.
- No record of Mary has been found after the death of her father.

== American revolution ==
At least thirty-four descendants of Thomas Wellman participated in the American Revolutionary War:

- great-grandson Joseph Wellman (1737-1783/4) of Wrentham marched on Lexington in Captain Samuel Cowell's company and served until 1779.
- great-great-grandson Thomas Wellman (1742–1818) of Lynnfield marched on Lexington in Captain Nathaniel Bancroft's company and served until 1777.
- great-great-grandson Jonathan Wellman (1747–1822) of Lynnfield marched on Lexington in Captain Nathaniel Bancroft's company.
- great-great-grandson Stephen Wellman (1746-after 1805) marched on Lexington in Captain Abraham Pierce's company of Waltham militia and was a corporal at the Battle of Dorchester Heights.
- great-great-grandson Timothy Wellman (1757–1842) of Mansfield was a private in Captain Isaac Hodge's company at the Battle of Dorchester Heights and the battle of Rhode Island.
- great-great-grandson Jacob Wellman (1746–1834) of Lyndeborough was wounded at the Battle of Bunker Hill as a private in Captain Levi Spaulding's company.
- great-great-grandson Joseph Wellman (1747–1831) was a private in Captain Abiel Clapp's Mansfield minutemen.
- great-great-grandson Peter Wellman (1750–1791) was a private in Captain Clapp's Mansfield minutemen and fought in the battle of Rhode Island.
- great-great-grandson Samuel Wellman (1751–1835) was a private in Captain Clapp's Mansfield minutemen.
- great-great-grandson Ebenezer Wellman (1752–1831) was a private in Captain Clapp's Mansfield minutemen and fought in the battle of Rhode Island.
- great-great-grandson Silas Wellman (1757-after 1818) was a private in Captain Clapp's Mansfield minutemen and served until 1782 at West Point, New York.
- great-great-grandson Samuel Wellman (1760–1829) was a private in Captain Clapp's Mansfield minutemen served until 1780 including the Battle of Trenton.
- great-great-grandson Isaac Wellman (1757–1840) of Cornish was a private in Captain Jonathan Chase's company at the Siege of Fort Ticonderoga (1777).
- great-great-grandson James Wellman (1754–1841) of Cornish was a ranger in Captain Josiah Russell's company at the siege of Fort Ticonderoga and the Saratoga campaign.
- great-great-grandson John Wellman (1758–1826) of Lyndeborough was a private in Colonel John Mellin's regiment at the siege of Fort Ticonderoga and in 1778 a corporal in Captain Samuel Dearborn's company in the battle of Rhode Island.
- great-grandson Reuben Wellman (1730–1798) was a private in the New Hampshire Regiment reinforcing the Continental Army at New York during the winter of 1776/7.
- great-great-grandson Solomon Wellman (1758–1841) of Cornish joined the Continental Army under General Horatio Gates for the Saratoga campaign.
- great-great-grandson Jacob Wellman (1761–1829) of Mansfield enlisted in 1776 and served through 1783 as a corporal at the battles of Saratoga, Monmouth, and Yorktown.
- great-great-grandson Abraham Wellman (1762–1829) of Lynn was a Continental Army drummer wounded at the battle of Monmouth.
- great-grandson Adam Wellman (1744/5-1802) of Wrentham was a gunner in Captain Perez Cushing's artillery company from 1776 and a corporal in Captain Samuel Cowell's company in 1778.
- great-grandson Elijah Wellman (1733–1790) of Attleborough was a private in Captain Stephen Richardson's company in 1777 and in Captain Samuel Robinson's company in 1780.
- great-great-grandson David Wellman (~1733-~1802) was a member of the Stoughtonham militia.
- great-grandson Jedediah Wellman (1748–1826) was a member of the Keene militia in 1776.
- great-great-grandson John Wellman (1755–1831) was a private in Captain Moses Knapp's company from 1775 to 1776.
- great-great-grandson Caleb Wellman (1761–1822) was a private in Captain Zadok Buffington's company in 1777 and in Captain Addison Richardson's company of Essex County militia in 1780.
- great-great-grandson Oliver Wellman (1761–1848) of Mansfield enlisted in the First Massachusetts Regiment of the Continental Army from 1779 through 1781.
- great-great-grandson Benoni Wellman (1765–1840) enlisted in 1782 as a private in Colonel Jackson's regiment.
- great-great-grandson Darius Wellman (~1761- ) was a corporal in the Athens, Vermont militia in 1782.
- great-grandson Adam Wellman (~1744-1786) of Salem was a privateer serving as lieutenant aboard the schooner Success in 1776, and commanding the brigantine Rover in 1780 and the schooner Jackal in 1782.
- great-grandson John Wellman (1748–1812) of Dedham was ship's doctor aboard the brigantine Hawke in Commodore John Manley's squadron.
- great-great-grandson Jedediah Wellman (1762–1858) of Danvers shipped aboard a privateer in 1776 and was taken prisoner at Portsmouth
- great-grandson Samuel Wellman (1727-before 1787) of Salem was captured by the British aboard the privateer sloop Gates in 1779.
- Samuel's son Oliver Kempton Wellman (1763-before 1790) served aboard the privateer Junius Brutus in 1780.
- Samuel's son Timothy Wellman (1768–1834) shipped aboard the sloop Tyrannicide in 1776 at the age of 8.

== Descendants ==
Two American towns have been named for the family:

- Wellman, Iowa named for Joseph Edward Wellman
- Wellman, Texas

Some notable members of the Wellman family in America:

- Lemuel Wellman Wright (1790-1886), inventor who lived in England from 1816 to 1857
- Bela Wellman (1819–1887), San Francisco Committee of Vigilance merchant during the California Gold Rush
- Abijah J. Wellman (1836–1889), New York state senator of the Wellman House
- Samuel T. Wellman (1847–1919), inventor
- Augustus Ogden Wellman (1850-1916), Santa Fe Railroad official for whom Wellman, Texas was named
- Arthur Holbrook Wellman (1855–1948), Massachusetts state senator
- Walter Wellman (1858–1934), journalist and explorer
- Jack London (1876–1916), author
- William A. Wellman (1896–1975), film director
- Harry R. Wellman (1899–1997), president of the University of California
- James Milo Wellman (1922–1971), founder of Wellman-Lord Engineering
