= William Barnett (engineer) =

William Hall Barnett (c. 1802 – August 1865) is described as a 'founder' in his 1836 patent, and an 'ironfounder' in his 1838 patent, and later as an engineer and gas engineer, working in Brighton, UK. He worked for many years for the Brighton and Hove General Gas Company. He was born in Bradford and died in Brighton.

== Patents ==
- UK Patent 7129 June 1836 "Generating and Purifying Gas"
- UK Patent 7615 April 1838 "Obtaining Motive Power"
- UK Patent 7727 July 1838 "Manufacture of Iron"

His patent of 1836 is recorded in the Mechanics Magazine as "Certain improvements for generating and purifying gas for the purposes of illumination". He also contributed the lead article for the Mechanics Magazine on 23 September 1839, titled "Barnett's improved method of working gas retorts", which again relates to production of coal gas.

The patent "Obtaining Motive Power" relates to some very early work on the gas internal combustion engine, which is described in more details below.

== Contribution to early gas engines ==
William Barnett was an engineer involved in the early development of internal combustion engines, and his work and patent are described over several pages in Dugald Clerk's book on Gas and Oil Engines. In Barnett's UK patent (No 7615 of 1838), which was entitled "Production of motive-power", Clerk states that "Barnett's inventions as described in his specification are so important that they require more complete description than has been accorded to earlier inventors", and he then proceeds to discuss Barnett's patent over several pages.

The patent describes three types of internal combustion engine run using gas as a fuel. These use two key inventions that were important to the early commercial gas engines (which do not appear until over 20 years later).

- One of the engines described in the patent uses compression of the fuel/air mixture in the power cylinder, the system which Clerk describes as "now so largely used in gas engines. The Frencheman, Lebon, it is true, described an engine using compression, in the year 1801, but his cycle is not in any way similar to that proposed by Barnett, or used in modern gas engines".
- The patent also describes a method for igniting the gas/air mixture within the cylinder using a flame transferred into the cylinder via an 'igniting cock'. This was a mechanism extensively used in many of the early commercial gas engines in the latter part of the 19th century.

The engines themselves are of considerable interest as precursors, not of the first commercial gas engines (e.g. Lenoir engine in 1860, which used the two-stroke cycle without compression, or the Otto and Langen atmospheric engines), but rather of the later generation of engines including Otto's engines operating on the four-stroke cycle and Dugald Clerk's engine operating on the two-stroke cycle, both with compression of the gas/air mixture in the cylinder.

== Characteristics of the engines ==
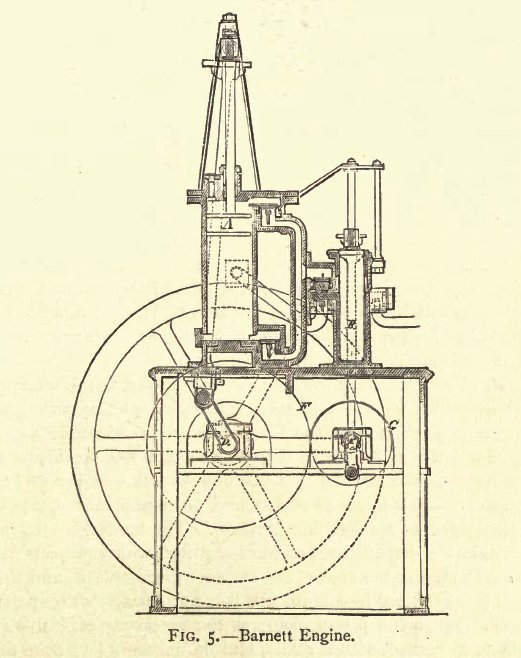
The 1838 two-stroke engine with in-cylinder compression (image taken from Dugald Clerk's book of 1886)

Note that all three engines operate on the two-stroke cycle, as did most early engines (the competition was steam engines, which also operate on the two-stroke cycle, and are usually double acting so every stroke is a power stroke). It was a remarkable leap to discover that, for internal combustion engines, the four-stroke cycle with three non-power strokes could deliver both economy and performance, see Alphonse Beau de Rochas who patented the idea in 1861, and Otto who made commercial engines using the four-stroke cycle after his earlier work with atmospheric engines. All three of Barnett's engines were vertical engines with a layout similar to steam table engines.

- The first engine is single acting using the two-stroke cycle, with separate pumps for gas and air, and a power cylinder. This cylinder is connected directly to a receiver vessel in which the combustion is initiated, the expansion flows into the power cylinder driving the piston. Timing of inlet and exhaust is via a piston valve, and an exhausting pump may be added to remove exhaust gases from the receiver prior to the new charge being forced in by the pumps. This is described as optional for smaller engines, as the exhaust gases are not so much a problem for them.
- The second engine is a double acting version of the first, i.e. combustion is alternately one side and then the other side of the piston. The operating principles are otherwise the same.
- The third engine is also double acting using the two-stroke cycle, and although it has the gas and air pumps of the others, it has an exhaust port uncovered by the piston towards the end of the power stroke, allowing the exhaust gases to exit and the fresh charge to enter the power cylinder and then be compressed by the piston prior to ignition at the end of the compression stroke.

The displayed image of the third engine reveals a double acting engine in the style of a steam table engine. The vertical cylinder is not water cooled. There is a central exhaust port on the cylinder wall uncovered by the piston. Separate gas and air pumps operates at twice engine speed to deliver the fresh charge to either end of the cylinder and purge the cylinder of exhaust gases, but the piston compresses the charge once the exhaust port is covered.

Dugald Clerk describes several patents on the internal combustion engine between 1839 and 1854, but states that "Of these patents, by far the most important is Barnett's". Praise indeed from an eminent engineer who would subsequently receive a KBE and become a fellow of the Royal Society.

The concept of a two-stroke double acting gas engine was later taken up by Körting who launched a 350bhp engine based on this principle in 1900. It was in production for many years. Heat management required a water cooled cylinder and piston. The air pump system was arranged so that air was admitted before gas/air mixture thus improving scavenging, and a longer piston meant less of the stroke was available for the scavenging to take place. Mechanical valve operation was used on the inlet valve and on control valves for the air and gas pumps. Further details can be found in the literature.

== See also ==
- History of the internal combustion engine
- Lemuel Wellman Wright who constructed and patented a non-compression gas engine of similar layout in 1833
