= Elisabeth Wollman =

French microbiologist and physicist

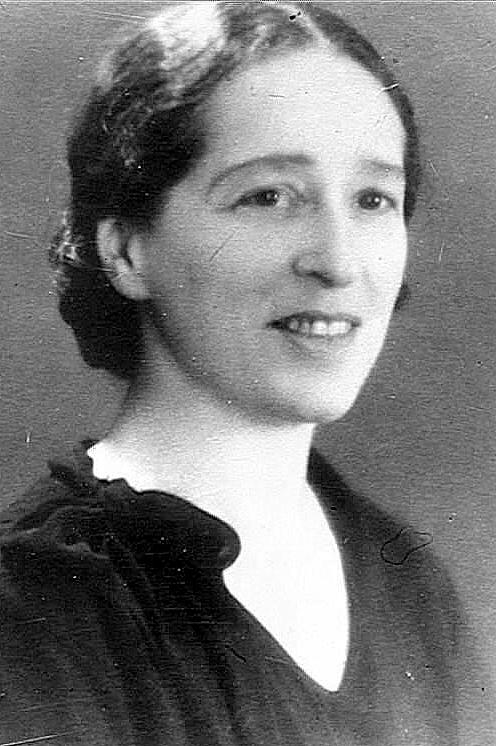
- Elisabeth Wollman in the early 1920s
- Born: Elisabeth Michelis; 15 August 1888; Minsk, Russian Empire (now Belarus)
- Died: 22 December 1943 (aged 55); Auschwitz concentration camp, German-occupied Poland
- Education: University of Liège
- Known for: Molecular genetics; Bacteriophages and lysogeny
- Spouse: Eugène Wollman (m. 1910; died 1943)
- Children: Alice Wollman; Élie Wollman; Nadine Marty
- Scientific career
- Fields: Biology
- Workplaces: Pasteur Institute

Elisabeth Wollman (née Michelis; 15 August 1888 – 22 December 1943) was a microbiologist at the Pasteur Institute in Paris. Born in Minsk in a Jewish family, she graduated from the University of Liège with a degree in physics and mathematics. She married the son of family friends, Eugène Wollman, and moved with him to Paris, where he began his career at the Pasteur Institute. Pioneers in the field of molecular genetics, the Wollmans collaborated for two decades on work that lay critical groundwork for understanding viruses, cancer, and HIV.

In December 1943, the couple were deported to the Auschwitz concentration camp, where they died soon after arrival, presumably murdered in gas chambers. A former student, André Lwoff, continued their work after the war, leading to a Nobel Prize in 1965. Their son, Élie Wollman, was part of the team. He and his son, Francis-André Wollman, both had prominent careers in science. One of the Wollman's daughters, Nadine Marty, became a professor of physics, and the other, Alice, became a medical doctor. Elisabeth, Eugène, and Élie Wollman are memorialized for their contributions to biology by a plaque at the Pasteur Institute.

== Early life ==
Elisabeth Wollman (née Michelis) was born in Minsk, then in the Russian Empire. Her husband-to-be, Eugène Wollman, was the son of long-time family friends. Both were Jewish, and moved to Belgium to study, with Michelis gaining a degree in physics and mathematics at the University of Liège.

The couple married after Eugène qualified as a doctor of medicine in 1909. He had a scholarship to study at the Pasteur Institute, working as an assistant to Élie Metchnikoff. Elisabeth accompanied him there, working as a voluntary assistant to physicist, biologist, and chemist Jacques Duclaux from 1910 to 1920. During that time, she gave birth to three children, Alice, Élie, and Nadine. Alice became a medical doctor. Élie Wollman was the couple's second child, born in 1917, and named after Metchnikoff. He became a microbiologist and prominent scientist. Nadine Marty became a physicist and professor, serving as the director of a division of the nuclear physics institute of Université de Paris Sud. Élie's son, Francis-André Wollman, also became a biologist, and research director of the French National Centre for Scientific Research (CNRS).

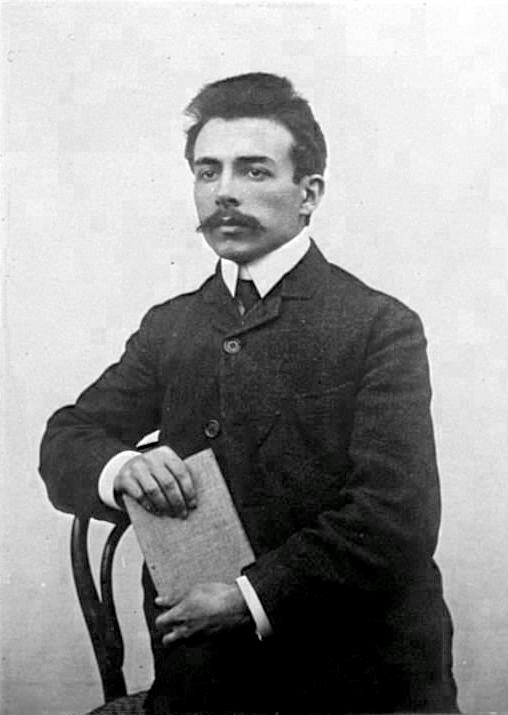
Eugène Wollman, circa 1910

During the First World War, Eugène volunteered as a doctor. He served in Paris, at the eastern front, and in Africa, and was awarded a military medal. In 1922, he gained French citizenship in recognition of his war service.

== Scientific collaboration ==
In 1919, Eugène was promoted to head of a laboratory at the Pasteur, and Elisabeth collaborated with him, again on a voluntary basis, from 1923 to 1943. Between 1929 and 1932, the family lived in Chile, when Eugène served as the director of the Institute Sanitas in Santiago.

The Wollmans co-authored most of the major publications of their work. Elisabeth had also co-authored a publication with Eugène in 1915. In 1933, she published a paper without his co-authorship, preceding a joint publication on the topic in 1935, indicative of the prominent role she had in their joint experimental work. From 1920 to 1943, the couple conducted experiments in bacteria to study bacteriophages and lysogeny, the cycle of infections in bacteria. They were among the first to recognise bacteriophage transmission of infection, a phenomenon they initially called "paraheredity". The Wollmans identified alternating infectious and non-infectious stages. Their studies in infection in bacteria made them early pioneers of molecular genetics.

== Holocaust ==
The couple's work was first limited, and then ended, by the Nazi occupation of France, beginning in 1940. Although they could not publish their work, and Eugène could not continue in his leadership position, the couple continued their research at the institute. In March 1943, police came to the Pasteur Institute to arrest Eugène, but the institute's director admitted him to hospital and told the police he was too ill to be moved. Wollman then slept at the hospital every night.

On 4 December, police arrested Elisabeth and Nadine at the Wollman home, and Eugène was arrested on the 10th. Nadine had married fellow physicist Claude Marty by then, and the couple worked for Frédéric Joliot-Curie (Marie Curie's son-in-law). Joliot-Curie managed to secure Nadine's release by getting the Japanese embassy to intervene. Élie Wollman was living under an assumed name in the south-west of France and active in the French Resistance. He came back to Paris to try to get his parents released. However, the Wollmans remained interned at Drancy camp.

Elisabeth and Eugène Wollman were sent to Auschwitz in Convoy 63, leaving Paris by rail on 17 December. Just over half of the group of around 900 people were selected for the gas chambers on arrival, and only 22 of the others survived to 1945. As both Wollman and her husband died in Auschwitz concentration camp on 22 December 1943, it is assumed they were among those murdered in the gas chambers.

== Scientific legacy ==
After the war, colleagues, joined by their son, continued the Wollmans' work. A former young student at the Pasteur Institute, André Lwoff, intending to show the importance of the Wollmans' findings. He picked up from where they had left off, including work from an unpublished manuscript. Using new specialized equipment that had not been available to the Wollmans, Lwoff was able to observe processes the Wollmans had speculated about. He developed a hypothesis critical to the understanding of viruses, and viruses and cancer. In 1965, he was awarded the Nobel Prize in Physiology or Medicine for this work, acknowledging the Wollmans' work in his Nobel lecture. One of his joint Nobel prize recipients, François Jacob, had been collaborating on lysogeny studies with the Wollmans' son, Élie. Lwoff's work in turn led to the understanding of retroviruses that enabled the discovery of the cause of HIV, as well as understanding of cancer.

A plaque in memory of Elisabeth, Eugène, and Élie Wollman was unveiled at the Émile-Roux pavilion of the Pasteur Institute in Paris in 2009. An Elisabeth Wollman archive is held at the Pasteur Institute, including personal correspondence and administrative records, as well as a scientific notebook. Photos of her as a student in Liège in 1908, and later with her husband, are online at the Pasteur Institute.
