= Enteromius wellmani =

Conservation status
- Data Deficient (IUCN 3.1)

Scientific classification
- Domain: Eukaryota
- Kingdom: Animalia
- Phylum: Chordata
- Class: Actinopterygii
- Order: Cypriniformes
- Family: Cyprinidae
- Subfamily: Smiliogastrinae
- Genus: Enteromius
- Species: E. wellmani

Binomial name
- Enteromius wellmani (Boulenger, 1911)

Synonyms
- Barbus wellmani Boulenger

Species of fish

Enteromius wellmani is a species of ray-finned fish in the genus Enteromius which is only found in the upper reaches of the Cuvo River system in Angola.

== Size ==
This species reaches a length of 8.0 cm (3.1 in).

== Etymology ==
The fish is named in honor of American medical missionary and tropical medicine specialist Frederick Creighton Wellman (1871–1960), who collected the holotype specimen.
