= Francis-André Wollman =

French biologist born on 5 May 1953 (born 1953)

Francis-André Wollman is a French biologist born on 5 May 1953. He is a research director at the CNRS and works at the Institut de biologie physico-chimique (IBPC) in Paris. He is a member of the French Academy of sciences.

His grandparents, Eugène and Elisabeth Wollman, researchers at the Pasteur Institute, were the pioneers of discoveries on phage and lysogeny (André Lwoff's later work earned him the Nobel Prize in 1965). Their work was brutally interrupted in December 1943 following their arrest by the French police and their murder in Auschwitz (a prize from the Academy of Sciences is dedicated to them). His father Élie Wollman, also a researcher at the Pasteur Institute, of which he was deputy director for many years, was one of the pioneers of bacterial genetics and brought to light the genetic nature of prophecy and the sexuality of bacteria. This last work was done in collaboration with François Jacob, who was awarded the Nobel Prize, also in 1965.

== Biography ==
After studying physico-chemistry at university, he received a scholarship from the Délégation Générale à la Recherche Scientifique et Technique (DGRST) in 1975 to study biological membranes. In 1977 he completed his PhD at the University of Paris VII (now Paris Diderot), followed in 1982 by a State Thesis (Habilitation) at the same university. He spent his entire career at the CNRS, where he was appointed Director of Exceptional Class Research in 2005 after having joined in 1980 as a research associate.

He does all his scientific research at the IBPC in Paris, a research establishment founded in 1927 where he joined Pierre Joliot's laboratory in 1975. From 1998 to 2018, he will head this laboratory, which has become a joint CNRS-Université-Pierre et Marie Curie research unit, under the title "Physiologie Membranaire et Moléculaire du Chloroplaste" (UMR7141). At the same time, in 2007, he was appointed Director of the Institute of Physical and Chemical Biology, a position he held until 2018.

In 2012, he also became Director of the "Labex DYNAMO" Laboratory of Excellence, which brings together biologists and chemists working at the IBPC at the Collège de France and the Ecole Normale Supérieure on different aspects of biogenesis, the function and evolution of energy-transmitting membranes.

Very committed to the defence of public research, whose cultural, educational and economic dimensions seem essential to the country's influence, he presided over the Plant Biology section of the National Committee for Scientific Research from 2000 to 2004, then sat on the High Council for Research and Technology from 2005 to 2014 and on the CNRS Scientific Council from 2014 to 2018. In 2004, he actively participated in the "Save Research" movement and became a member of the board of the Initiative and Proposal Committee (CIP), led by Etienne-Emile Baulieu and Edouard Brezin (President and vice-president of the French Academy of sciences), which organizes the Etats Généraux de la Recherche in Grenoble.

== Scientific work ==
Francis-André Wollman's scientific work has been devoted to the biogenesis, regulation and evolution of oxygen photosynthesis. Using the power of the genetic approach in a microalgae, Chlamydomonas reinhartdii, he combined biophysical, biochemical and structural biology approaches to establish an exhaustive mapping of the composition of photosynthesis proteins and their supramolecular organization within photosynthetic membranes. He showed how dynamic this organization is in allowing photosynthesis to react to changes in the environment.

His work on the biogenesis of the photosynthetic apparatus has led him to identify post-endosymbiotic innovations that are decisive for the genetic integration of nucleo-cytosolic and chloroplastic compartments. His work shows how the nucleus of the photosynthetic cell has taken control of the expression of chloroplast genes. He discovered, in the chloroplast, an original mechanism of self-regulation of translation for certain photosynthesis proteins that are only produced if they can be assembled in a functional protein complex (CES process). Recently, he revisited the early days of endosymbiosis by showing how protein addressing signals to intracellular organelles would derive from antimicrobial peptides against which the ancestors of mitochondria and chloroplasts developed resistance.

== Honours and awards ==
=== Awards and honours ===
- 1984: Prize of the French Academy of sciences in homage to the French scientists murdered by the Germans
- 1996: Fuller's Prize of the French Academy of sciences
- 2000: CNRS Silver medal
- 2018: Chevalier of the Légion d'Honneur

=== Scientific societies ===
- 1999-2003: President of the French Society of Photosynthesis
- 2004-2010: Member of the Board of Directors of the International Society of Photosynthesis
- 2000: Member of EMBO (European Molecular Biology Organisation)
- 2017: Elected member of Academia Europaea
- 2017: Elected member of the French Academy of sciences
- Institutional activities
- 2000-2004: President of the Plant Biology Section of the National Committee for Scientific Research
- 2005-2014: Member of the Higher Council for Research and Technology, placed under the Ministry of Higher Education and Research.
- 2006-2014: Member of the Scientific Council of Life Sciences at the CNRS
- 2007-2010: Member of the Scientific Council of the Ile de France region.
- 2007-2012: Member of the Board of Directors of Henri Poincaré University, Nancy, France.
- 2007-2018: Member of the Assembly of 100 of the Institut Pasteur.
- 2014: Member of the executive committee of the University of Paris Sciences et Lettres (PSL)
- 2014-2018: Member of the CNRS Scientific Council
- 2019: Member of the Board of Directors of the Edmond de Rothschild Foundation

=== Editorial activities ===
- Associate editor with Photosynthesis Research (1992-1996)
- Publisher associated with Current Genetics (2001- 2010)
- Consultant editor at The Plant Cell (2015-2018)
