= Joseph Day (inventor) =

English engineer

- Born: 1855; London, United Kingdom
- Died: 1946 (aged 90–91)
- Occupation: Engineer

Joseph Day (1855 – 1946) is a little-known English engineer who developed the extremely widely used crankcase-compression two-stroke petrol engine, as used for small engines from lawnmowers to mopeds and small motorcycles. He trained as an engineer at the Crystal Palace School of Engineering at Crystal Palace in London, began work at Stothert & Pitt in Bath, and in 1889 designed the crankcase-compression two-stroke engine as it is widely known today (in contrast to the two-stroke engine designed by Dugald Clerk), the Valve-less Two-Stroke Engine. In 1878 he started his own business, an iron foundry making cranes, mortar mills and compressors amongst other things.

== Valveless two-stroke engine ==
One product advertised by Day's new company was a range of valveless air compressors, built under licence from the patentee Edmund Edwards. By 1889, Day was working on an engine design that would not infringe the patents that Otto had on the four-stroke and which he would eventually call the Valveless Two-Stroke Engine. In fact there was at least one valve in Joseph Day's original design, a simple check valve in the inlet port communicating directly with the crankcase, where you would probably find a reed valve on a modern two stroke.

His patent No.6,410 of 1891/2 covered variants with a piston controlled transfer port or an additional check valve in the crown of the piston through which the combustible mixture could pass from the crankcase to the cylinder. He made about 250 of these first two-port motors, fitting them to small generating sets, which won a prize at the International Electrical Exhibition in 1892.

Shortly after the introduction of the new engine one of Joseph Day's workmen, Frederick Cock, patented a modification which enabled it to become genuinely valveless. An additional port lower in the cylinder wall allowed the skirt of the piston to control the inlet phase thus doing away with the check valve and giving rise to the classic three-port layout. Only two of these original engines have survived, one in the Deutsches Museum in Munich, the other in the Science Museum in London.

== American patent ==
The first American patent was taken out in 1894, and by 1906, a dozen American companies had taken licences. One of these, Palmers of Connecticut, managed by entrepreneur Julius Briner, had produced over 60,000 two-stroke engines before 1912. Many of these early engines found their way into motorcycles, or onto the back of boats.

== Bath factory ==
His company in Bath was a general engineering one, and his engines were a sideline. Much of his money came from the manufacture of bread making machinery, and the prices of wheat were very turbulent around the turn of the Century. The profitability of Day's factory fluctuated just as wildly. These were early days for the idea of the limited company, and shareholders, then as now, could panic and bring down a company that they thought to be under threat. The problem was made worse by the publication of rumours, or the deliberate orchestration of publicity campaigns in the press.

== Lawsuits ==
Joseph Day suffered from his involvement with both of the aforementioned, with the result that his firm was driven into bankruptcy. A flurry of lawsuits followed, with Day as either plaintiff or defendant. The Treasury Solicitor even tried to have him extradited from the USA where he had gone to try to sell his US patents in order to raise money. The case was eventually settled when the jury found that Day had no case to answer, but it all came too late, and he went into virtual retirement by the seaside. The development of his engine then passed to his licence holders in America, whose royalties restored his finances sufficiently to allow him to launch a spectacular new venture after the First World War. This new enterprise was the exploration for oil.

== Obscurity and death ==
Day lost most of his fortune exploring for oil in Norfolk in the east of England. A second financial disaster was the last straw, and Joseph Day disappeared from public view between 1925 and his death in 1946. His obscurity was so complete that a mere five years after his death, the Science Museum made a public appeal for biographical information about him – with no apparent result.

== Bibliography ==
- Torrens, Hugh (1991). Joseph Day. Bath Industrial Heritage Trust. ISBN 0-9518602-0-8.
