= Bela Wellman =

19th-century Californian Gold Rush merchant

- Born: December 17, 1819; Attleboro, Massachusetts
- Died: January 31, 1887 (aged 67); Fruitvale, California

Bela Wellman (December 17, 1819 – January 31, 1887) was a California Gold Rush merchant who formed the wholesale grocery firm of Wellman, Peck and Company.

== Early years ==
Bela was the tenth of eleven children of Lot Wellman and the third born to his second wife, Rebecca (Cole) Wellman. Lot was a cooper and a great-great-grandson of Puritan Thomas Wellman, who immigrated to the Massachusetts Bay Colony about 1640.

Bela left home at age 12 to work on a farm in Plainfield, Connecticut. After farming through the summer, he was able to attend school through the winter and became a clerk in a country store. He formed the cotton textile firm of Lamphier, Wellman and Company of Baltimore, Maryland, in 1842, and became a cotton wholesaler in New Orleans, Louisiana. Recognizing the business opportunities of the California gold rush, he sailed from Panama on 17 August 1849, and arrived in San Francisco on 8 November.

== Wellman, Peck and Company ==
Upon arrival in San Francisco, Bela erected a building on Kearny Street using lumber he had shipped with him from Panama. He established an auction and commission business in the building under the name of B. Wellman and Company and soon specialized in groceries. The business continued after the building on Kearny Street burned in 1851. Wellman formed the partnership of Verplanck, Wellman and Company in 1861, and the company was renamed Wellman, Peck and Company when John M. Peck purchased Verplanck's interest in 1863. By 1880 the company employed 30 men in a Pacific importing and wholesale business amounting to two million dollars annually. The firm was California's largest manufacturing wholesale grocer in 1941, when it sponsored the Wellman Valor Award Medal for acts of bravery by Californians. The company marketed coffee, green beans, and marmalade as Wellman "Flavor Famous" Foods through the first half of the 20th century. The large red neon WELLMAN COFFEE sign was a mid-20th century San Francisco landmark from San Francisco Bay.

== Life in California ==
Wellman assisted organizing the San Francisco Committee of Vigilance, and two alleged murderers from the Hounds gang were hanged on his property. The Hounds were former Mexican–American War soldiers from New York City who hounded Latin American and Chinese people through thievery and extortion.

Bela married Ruth Anna Harker at Monterey, California on 18 May 1862. They had eight children born in San Francisco. Their eldest son, William Bela Wellman (born 7 June 1864), became the senior member of Wellman, Peck and Company after his father died in Fruitvale, California, on 31 January 1887. The Bela Wellman memorial grove was established in Jedediah Smith Redwoods State Park in 1944.
