= Élie Wollman =

French microbial geneticist

- Born: July 4, 1917; Paris, France
- Died: June 1, 2008 (aged 90); Paris, France
- Known for: Plasmids, conjugation
- Spouse: Odile Wollman
- Scientific career
- Fields: Microbial genetics
- Institutions: Pasteur Institute
- Thesis: Recherche sur la conjugaison des bactéries et sur le déterminisme génétique de la lysogénie [studies on bacterial conjugation and genetic determinism of lysogeny] (1958)

Élie Léo Wollman (July 4, 1917 – June 1, 2008) was a French microbial geneticist who first described plasmids (what he termed "episomes"), and served as vice director of research for the Pasteur Institute for twenty years. He was awarded the 1976 Grand Prix Charles-Leopold Mayer by the French Academy of Sciences and Chevalier of the French Legion of Honour. He is the son of microbiologists at the Pasteur Institute, Eugène and Elisabeth Wollman, and the father of Francis-André Wollman, another prominent scientist.

== Research ==
- In his lab at the Pasteur Institute in Paris Wollman played a key role in the elucidation of the organization of genetic material.
- Developed the experimental method of interrupted mating, which underpinned the gene mapping of bacterial chromosomes. This work laid the foundation for Francois Jacob's Nobel Prize-winning work.
- With Francois Jacob, he published a monograph, Sexuality and the genetics of bacteria (French title: La sexualité des bactéries), in 1959.

== Selected publications ==
- Wollman, Élie L; François Jacob (1961). Sexuality and the genetics of bacteria. New York: Academic Press.
- Wollman, E. L.; Jacob, F.; Hayes, W. (1956). "Conjugation and Genetic Recombination in Escherichia coli K-12". Cold Spring Harbor Symposia on Quantitative Biology. 21: 141–162. doi:10.1101/SQB.1956.021.01.012. PMID 13433587.
