= Marianela =

Marianela may refer to:

== People ==
=== Given name ===
- Marianela De La Hoz (born 1956), Mexican painter
- Marianela González (born 1978), Venezuelan actress
- Marianela Huen (born 1960), Venezuelan swimmer
- Marianela Lacayo (born 1981), Nicaraguan model and entrepreneur
- Marianela Mirra (born 1988), Argentine television personality
- Mariela Muñoz (1943–2017), Argentine activist and politician
- Marianela Núñez (born 1982), Argentine dancer
- Marianela Pinales (born 1972), Dominican lawyer
- Marianela Quesada (born 1988), Costa Rican swimmer
- Marianela Rodriguez (born 1991), Cuban model and actress
- Marianela Salazar (born c. 1978), Panamanian model
- Marianela Szymanowski (born 1990), Argentine footballer

=== Other ===
- Carmen Barros (born 1925), Chilean actress and singer nicknamed Marianela

== Media ==
- Marianela (1940 film), a 1940 Spanish film
- Marianela (1955 film), a 1955 Argentine film
- Marianela (novel), an 1878 novel by Benito Pérez Galdós
- Marianela (TV series), a 1961 Mexican telenovela
