= Progressive Conservative Party of Ontario candidates in the 1985 Ontario provincial election =

The Progressive Conservative Party of Ontario ran a full slate of candidates in the 1985 provincial election, and won 52 seats out of 130 to win a minority government. They were defeated in the legislature shortly after the election. Many of the party's candidates have their own biography pages; information about others may be found here.

== Harriet Wolman (Oakwood) ==
Wolman is a legal conveyancer in private life. She was elected to the York Borough Board of Education for the city's second ward in 1974, and was named chairman of the board after being re-elected without opposition two years later. Shortly after her appointment, she argued that the board should play a stronger role in fighting racism in Toronto.

She later defended the purchase of a $250,000 country camp in 1978, arguing that the board had previously spent large sums of money to rent other facilities for outdoor studies. Endorsed for re-election by The Globe and Mail newspaper in 1978, she was narrowly returned despite the controversy over the board's purchase. She was not re-appointed as chairman.

Wolman campaigned for the York Board of Control in 1980, but was defeated. She later served as special assistant to Progressive Conservative cabinet minister Larry Grossman.

Wolman campaigned for the Legislative Assembly of Ontario in 1981 and 1985 as a Progressive Conservative candidate, but lost both times to New Democratic Party incumbent Tony Grande. She was later appointed to the Canadian government's Convention Refugee Determination Division in Toronto. She was also the chairman of the public affairs committee of the Ontario Long Term Residential Care Association, and managing director of a retirement home.

=== Electoral record ===
1985 Ontario general election: Oakwood
Party	Candidate	Votes	%
New Democratic	Tony Grande	10,407	41.63
Liberal	Joe Ricciuti	9,631	38.52
Progressive Conservative	Harriet Wolman	4,636	18.54
Communist	Mike Sterling	327	1.31
Total valid votes		25,001	100.00
Total rejected, unmarked and declined ballots		308	
Turnout		25,309	68.62
Electors on the lists		36,884	

1981 Ontario general election: Oakwood
Party	Candidate	Votes	%	Expenditures
New Democratic	Tony Grande	8,862	45.17	$12,929
Progressive Conservative	Harriet Wolman	5,961	30.39	$24,885
Liberal	Jean M. Gammage	4,171	21.26	$14,485
Communist	Nan McDonald	624	3.18	$1,122
Total valid votes		19,618	100.00	
Total rejected, unmarked and declined ballots		315		
Turnout		19,933	56.22	
Electors on the lists		35,453		

== Elaine Herzog (St. Catharines) ==
Herzog had been a regional councillor and chair of the local Board of Education before campaigning for provincial office. In 1985, she criticized the regional government of Niagara for being unable to reform itself, and bring about efficiencies. She received 9,029 votes (25.39%) in 1987, finishing second against Liberal incumbent Jim Bradley.

During a legislative speech in 2001, Bradley described Herzog as a "top-notch person" and a moderate Conservative in the Bill Davis model. He also argued that she would have opposed the education policies of the Mike Harris Progressive Conservative government.

== Toomas Ounapuu (York South) ==
Ounapuu was born in Sweden to an Estonian family, and moved to Canada in 1950. He was an Assistant Crown Attorney in York, Ontario during the 1970s, and was appointed by provincial Attorney General Roy McMurtry to shut down the unlicensed body-rub parlours on Yonge Street in 1977. He was successful, saying that "there wasn't a bawdy house left" when he finished his work. Ounapuu took a two-year leave of absence to work as a prosecutor in Hamilton, Bermuda in 1978, and became a criminal lawyer following his return to Canada. He has participated in several notable cases, and as of 2006 is representing former Toronto City Councillor Steve Ellis against high-profiles charges of misconduct.

Ounapuu ran for the Toronto Board of Education in 1982, and was defeated. He was 38 years old in 1985.

Electoral record
Election	Division	Party	Votes	%	Place	Winner
1982 municipal	Toronto Board of Education, Ward Two	n/a	1,870		4/5	Sheila Meagher and Beare Weatherup
1985 provincial	York South	Progressive Conservative	5,321	17.56	3/6	Bob Rae, New Democratic Party

The 1982 municipal result is taken from the Toronto Star, 9 November 1982, B4, with 138 of 140 polls reporting.
