= Wellman House =

Historic house in New York, United States

- U.S. National Register of Historic Places
- Location within New York Location within the United States
- Location: Main St., Friendship, New York
- Coordinates: 42°12′22″N 78°8′13″W
- Area: 3.5 acres (1.4 ha)
- Built: 1835
- NRHP reference No.: 74001219
- Added to NRHP: June 20, 1974

Wellman House is a historic home located at Friendship in Allegany County, New York. It is a 2 1/2-story, clapboard dwelling constructed in 1835 and remembered as the residence of Col. Abijah Wellman. A Mansard roof was added later to the original house. It is surrounded by three and a half acres of well kept formal gardens and is the centerpiece of the town of Friendship.

It was listed on the National Register of Historic Places in 1974.

== Colonel Abijah Joslyn Wellman ==
Colonel Wellman was a great-great-great-great-grandson of Puritan Thomas Wellman. Abijah was born in Friendship on 6 May 1836 and engaged in mercantile business in 1855 and in banking in 1860. In September, 1861, he recruited a company of volunteers for the American Civil War, and was appointed their captain. He was appointed a major when his volunteers became Company C of the 85th New York Volunteer Infantry Regiment, and commissioned a lieutenant colonel on 14 March 1862. He was wounded in the head at the Battle of Seven Pines on 31 May 1862. He was disabled by the wound and honorably discharged 24 March 1863. He married Kate Miner of Friendship on 17 September 1863 and they had five children. He became cashier of the First National Bank of Friendship in 1864 and was elected state senator for Allegany, Livingston, and Wyoming Counties from 1874 to 1877. He was a successful Allegany oil field operator from 1882 until his death in Friendship on 8 June 1889.
