= Wallmann =

Wallmann is a German surname. Notable people with the surname include:

- H. Johannes Wallmann (born 1952), contemporary composer and integral artist
- Johannes Wallmann (theologian) (1930–2021), German theologian and emeritus professor of church history at the Ruhr-Universität Bochum
- Margarete Wallmann (1901–1992), ballerina, choreographer, stage designer, and opera director
- Walter Wallmann (1932–2013), German politician who has served as Lord Mayor of Frankfurt (1977–1986)
