= Phyllis Crawford =

American writer

Phyllis Crawford (February 8, 1899 – July 1980) was, during the 1930s and 1940s, an American author of books for children in their early teens.

== Early life and education ==
Born in Little Rock, Arkansas, she graduated from Randolph-Macon Woman's College in 1920 and then from library school at the University of Illinois in 1924 and became an editorial assistant for H.W. Wilson. During the Great Depression, Crawford was employed by the Federal Art Project as head of research for the Index of American Design, a position she held until 1937.

== Writing career ==
In 1930, Crawford published her first children's book The Blot: Little City Cat. In 1938, she wrote Hello the Boat! (Holt, 1938), which won the top prize of $3,000 from the Julia Ellsworth Ford Foundation and was a 1939 Newbery Award honoree. Subsequent books were In England Still (Arrowsmith, 1938), Walking on Gold (Messner, 1940), The Secret Brother (Holt, 1941), Last Semester (Holt, 1942), Second Shift (Holt, 1943) and Let's Go! (Holt, 1946). She also wrote an adult novel, Elsie Dinsmore on the Loose (Cape, 1930).

== Personal life ==
Crawford was a longtime resident of Santa Fe, New Mexico, living in the area since 1951.
