= Paul Wellman =

American screenwriter (1895–1966)

Paul I. Wellman
- Paul I. Wellman in 1953
- Born: Paul Iselin Wellman; October 15, 1895; US
- Died: September 17, 1966 (aged 70); US
- Occupations: Novelist, screenwriter, and journalist
- Writing career
- Language: English
- Genres: Western, popular history, non-fiction

Paul Iselin Wellman (October 15, 1895 — September 17, 1966) was an American journalist, popular history and novel writer, and screenwriter, known for his books of the Wild West: Kansas, Oklahoma, Great Plains. Hollywood movies Cheyenne (1947) with Jane Wyman, The Walls of Jericho (1948) with Kirk Douglas, The Iron Mistress (1952) with Alan Ladd as Jim Bowie, Apache (1954) with Burt Lancaster and Jean Peters, Jubal (1956) with Ernest Borgnine and Rod Steiger, and The Comancheros (1961) with John Wayne and Lee Marvin are based on Wellman novels.

Wellman's brother, Manly Wade Wellman, was also a well published author, as was his father, Frederick Creighton Wellman under the pseudonym Cyril Kay-Scott. Another brother, Frederick Lovejoy Wellman, was a noted plant pathologist.

== Literary works ==
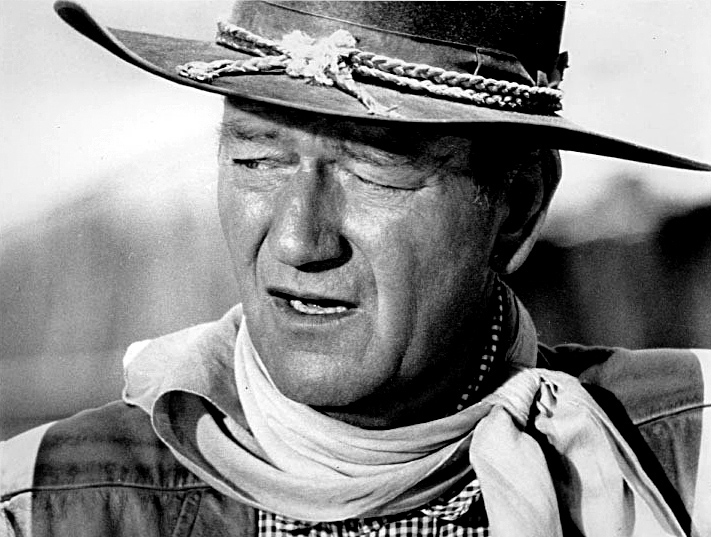
John Wayne in the film version of the Wellman novel The Comancheros

- Death on the Prairie, 1934
- Death in the Desert, 1935
- Broncho Apache, 1936
- Jubal Troop, 1939
- The Trampling Herd: The Story of the Cattle Range in America, 1939
- Angel with Spurs, 1942
- The Bowl of Brass, 1944
- The Walls of Jericho, 1947
- Death on Horseback, 1947 (combines Death on the Prairie & Death in the Desert)
- The Indian Wars of the West, 1947 (formerly Death on Horseback)
- The Chain, 1949
- The Iron Mistress, 1951 (about Jim Bowie)
- The Comancheros, 1952
- The Female, A Novel of Another Time, 1953 (about Empress Theodora)
- Glory, God and Gold, 1954
- The Blazing Southwest, The Pioneer Story of the American Southwest, 1954
- Jericho's Daughters, 1956
- Portage Bay, 1957
- Ride the Red Earth, 1958
- The Fiery Flower, 1959
- Indian Wars and Warriors—East, 1959
- Indian Wars and Warriors—West, 1959
- Gold in California, 1958
- Stuart Symington, 1960
- Race to the Golden Spike, 1961
- A Dynasty of Western Outlaws, 1961
- Magnificent Destiny, 1962 (about Andrew Jackson and Sam Houston)
- The Greatest Cattle Drive, 1964
- Spawn of Evil, 1964
- The Devil's Disciples, 1965
- The House Divides: The Age of Jackson and Lincoln, 1966
- The Buckstones, 1967
