= Lemuel Wellman Wright =

- Born: 9 April 1790; Plainfield, New Hampshire
- Died: 25 April 1886 (aged 96); Brooklyn, New York
- Occupation: inventor
- Parent(s): Ebenezer Wright (1756-1798) and Martha (Wellman) Wright (1763-1839)

Lemuel Wellman Wright (1790-1886) was an inventor who was active in the early 19th century. He was born in Plainfield, New Hampshire, and educated at Haverhill, New Hampshire. He then took a raft down the Connecticut River to Middletown, Connecticut, where he learned the clockmaker trade. He opened a clock-making shop in New York City before accepting a position to introduce American textile manufacturing machinery to the United Kingdom of Great Britain and Ireland. He remained in the British Isles from 1816 until returning to New York in 1857. The name Lemuel Wellman Wright is recorded in the British patent index for the patents listed below, but some texts use Lemuel Willman Wright to refer to the author of the same patents. There are contemporary references to an American from Massachusetts, Lemuel William Wright, who patented machinery and created a factory to make pins in London. The patent subject index lists the author of a patent for making pins in 1824 as Lemuel Wellman Wright (patent number 4955 of 1824), and has no other similar names recorded related to pins, so unless the patent office publication is in error, all these references appear to be to the same inventor.

== List of Patents ==
Lemuel Wellman Wright was responsible for a considerable number of British patents in the first half of the 19th century, for example :

- No 4507 of 1820 "Combination of machinery for making bricks and tiles"
- No 4955 of 1824 "Machinery for making pins; also combinations of such machinery"
- No 5154 of 1825 "Machinery for washing, cleansing, or bleaching linens, cottons and other fabrics, good or fibrous substances"
- No 5400 of 1826 "Construction of Trucks or Carriages;-applicable to other useful purposes"
- No 5473 of 1827 "Combination and Arrangement of machinery for making metal screws"
- No 5544 of 1827 "Construction of Cranes"
- No 5638 of 1828 "Construction of Wheeled Carriages"
- No 5703 of 1828 "Machinery for making screws"
- No 6525 of 1833 "Combination and arrangement of machinery whereby known agents may be employed in producing power"
- No 6655 of 1834 "Machinery for refrigerating fluids"
- No 7251 of 1836 "Machinery for bleaching or cleansing linens, cottons, or other fabrics, goods, or other fibrous substances"
- No 7348 of 1837 "Machinery for bleaching or cleansing linens, cottons, or other fabrics, goods, or other fibrous substances"
- No 8028 of 1839 "Machinery for bleaching or cleansing linens, cottons, or other fabrics, goods, or other fibrous substances"
- No 9787 of 1843 "Machinery for bleaching various fibrous substances"

== Pins ==
According to the Merchants Magazine from 1851 "Lemuel William Wright patented a machine for making solid headed pins both in the United States, and in England". In London he built "a large stone factory in Lambeth, and constructed some sxity machines, at great expense. It is understood that the machines failed in pointing the pins, and for that reason never could be put into successful operation." The company failed, but one of the investors (D.F. Taylor) created a factory in 1832 in Stroud, Gloucestershire and successfully made pins.

== Cranes ==
In the 1827 patent (no 5544) Lemuel describes two forms of crane. One operated by hand and another by compressed air using an engine similar to a steam engine. This afforded advantages for mobile cranes where a central plant could provide compressed air.

== Gas Engine ==
The 2-stroke double acting gas engine patented by Wright in 1833

Lemuel Wright is also responsible for one of the very early patents for internal combustion engines, British patent number 6525 of 1833. One of the earliest sources to describe his engine and patent is the scientist and engineer Dugald Clerk (later Sir Dugald Clerk FRS) in his book "Gas and Oil Engines" first published in 1886. Dugald Clerk is the creator of the first commercial engine operating on the 2-stroke cycle with in-cylinder compression, and is often considered to be the originator of the modern 2-stroke engine. In summarising the importance of patents prior to 1860 (when the internal combustion became a commercial reality), Clerk states : "The greatest credit is due to Wright and Barnett. Wright very closely proposed the modern non-compression system, Barnett the modern compression system.".

=== Dugald Clerk's Commentary on Wright's Gas Engine Patent ===
"In this specification the drawings are very complete and the details are carefully worked out. The explosion of a mixture of inflammable gas and air acts directly upon the piston, which acts through a connecting rod upon a crank-shaft. The engine is double-acting, the piston receiving two impulses for every revolution of the crank-shaft. In appearance it resembles a high pressure steam engine of the kind known as the table pattern. The gas and air are supplied to the motor cylinder from separate pumps through two reservoirs, at a pressure a few pounds above atmosphere, the gases (gas and air) enter spherical spaces at the ends of the motor cylinder, partly displacing the previous contents, and are ignited while the piston is crossing the dead centre. The explosion pushes the piston up or down through its whole stroke; at the end of the stroke the exhaust valve opens and the products of combustion are discharged during the return, excepting the portion remaining in the spaces not entered by the piston. The ignition is managed by an external flame and touch-hole.

The author (Clerk) has been unable to find whether the engine was ever made, but the knowledge of the detail essential to a working gas engine shown by the drawings indicates that it or some similar machine had been worked by the inventor.

Both cylinder and piston are water-jacketed, as would have been necessary in a double-acting gas engine to preserve the working parts from damage from the intense heat of the explosion. This is the earliest drawing in which this detail is properly shown."

=== Observations regarding the patent drawing ===
The engine depicted uses a centrifugal governor to control the speed of the engine. Early internal combustion engines did not have the benefit of a throttle, and with separate air and gas pumps and the need to keep the gas/air mixture is a specific range to achieve reliable ignition and combustion, the control of speed was significantly different from steam engines. For this reason many early engines operate on a hit-and-miss principle, either a full charge of gas and air or no gas at all.

== See also ==
- History of the internal combustion engine
- William Barnett (engineer) who patented engines with similar layout in 1838
