= Owen Merton =

British painter

Owen Heathcote Grierson Merton, Royal Society of British Artists (RBA) (14 May 1887–18 January 1931) was a New Zealand-born British painter, known primarily for his watercolours, landscapes, and seascapes. His work shows the influence of the Post-Impressionist representational style.

Merton was born in Christchurch, New Zealand, where he studied at the Canterbury College School of Art. He married Ruth Jenkins, an American, by whom he had two sons, Tom, who became the American Trappist monk and writer Thomas Merton and John Paul Merton. (Owen Merton is described in his son Thomas' famous spiritual autobiography, The Seven Storey Mountain.) He worked at different times as a church organist and cinema pianist. He studied sketching under Frances Hodgkins in 1910. He painted in England and France until 1916, when the First World War caused him and his family to relocate with his in-laws in the vicinity of Flushing, Long Island, where he worked briefly as a landscape gardener.

After the 1921 death of his wife, Merton lived on Cape Cod, Massachusetts, then on Bermuda. Throughout his career, Merton exhibited his paintings, with varying degrees of success. After returning to Europe during 1923, Owen Merton was elected to the Royal Society of British Artists. He was president of the local rugby club at Saint-Antonin where he settled with Tom in 1925; in Saint-Antonin he played piano in the local cinema. He continued to travel between his birthplace of New Zealand, Europe, and the US. He died of a brain tumour in London, England, during 1931.

Paintings by Owen Merton are on permanent display in galleries around the world, most particularly in the Museum of New Zealand.
