= Frederick Lovejoy Wellman =

American phytopathologist (1897–1994)

Frederick Lovejoy Wellman (b.1897 Kamundongo, Portuguese West Africa, d. 21 April 1994 Raleigh, North Carolina) was an American phytopathologist who worked mainly on diseases of coffee but also on the fungus Fusarium oxysporum f.sp. cubense, the pathogen which causes Panama disease in bananas.

== Early life ==
Wellman was born in 1897 in Kamundongo in modern Angola. His parents, Frederick Creighton Wellman and Lydia Jeanette Isely, had gone there in 1896 to work as medical missionaries for a British charity. The family lived in Portuguese West Africa for 9 years. The family returned to the United States and his father was appointed as professor of tropical medicine at the Oakland (California) College of Medicine. By 1911 his parents were divorced, by which time the Frederick had three siblings and the family were living in Wichita, Kansas. Wellman was an undergraduate at Fairmount College, graduating in 1920 with a bachelor's degree. He then studied the University of Wisconsin–Madison, where he gained his Master of Arts in 1924 and has Ph.D. in 1928.

== Career ==
Wellman went to Honduras following graduation, employed by the United Fruit Company as a phytopathologist, for whom he studied Fusarium oxysporum, the fungus that causes Panama disease in bananas. He was also employed by the U.S. Department of Agriculture, as well as the Inter-American Institute of Agricultural Sciences (the IICA or Instituto Interamericano de Ciencias Agriacutecolas) located in Turrialba, Costa Rica. He was also the head of the Department of Plant Pathology and Botany at the Agricultural Experiment Station at the University of Puerto Rico, at Rio Piedras. Wellman traveled all over the world to study coffee and to prepare the New World for the eventual spread of coffee rust from Africa. In his career he spent a total of over 25 years in the field, working in mostly the tropics. He visited Africa in the early 1950s, traveling to coffee producing areas before visiting the Centro de Invesgação das Ferrugens do Cafeeiro (CIFC) in Oeiras, Portugal where he arranged for the CIFC's technical assistance to coffee producing countries in the Americas in the event of coffee rust's arrival there. This bore fruit when a coffee rust outbreak occurred in Brazil in 1970, followed by other outbreaks in the Americas.

When he retired from his role at the University of Puerto Rico in 1963, he took the post of visiting professor of plant pathology at North Carolina State University, being appointed Professor Emeritus in 1971. While he was on faculty at NCSU, he authored three books. As one of the leading plant pathologists in the Americas he set up the Caribbean Division of the American Phytopathological Society (APS) and served as its inaugural president and this division recognised his distinguished service in 1971 by giving him an Award of Merit. In 1974, Wellman was further honored with the status of a Fellow of the APS. As well as the APS he also had membership of Sigma Xi, Phi Sigma, the Washington Academy of Sciences, and the Puerto Rico Academy of Arts and Sciences. Wellman was also honored as a Fellow of the American Association for the Advancement of Science.

== Publications ==
Wellman wrote no less than 4 books and over 200 other publications.

The books are:

- Coffee: botany, cultivation and utilization (1961)
- Plant diseases; an introduction for the layman (1970)
- Tropical American plant disease (Neotropical Phytopathology Problems) 1972
- Dictionary of tropical American crops and their diseases 1977

== Personal life ==
Wellman's full siblings were Manly Wade Wellman, a science fiction author, Paul Wellman, a journalist, screenwriter, historian and novelist and Alice Wellman Harris, a children's author, theater director and producer. Wellman married Dora U'ren Wellman in 1918, she predeceased him in 1990, the couple had one child, a son, Frederick Creighton Wellman IV. He died on the 21 April 1994 at the Rex Hospital in Raleigh, NC.
