= François Jacob =

French biologist (1920–2013)

François Jacob ForMemRS
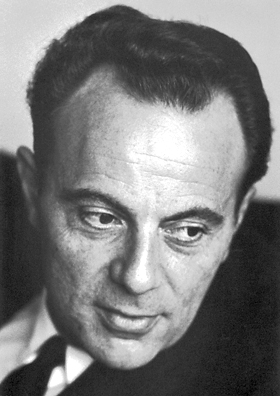
- Born: 17 June 1920; Nancy, France
- Died: 19 April 2013 (aged 92); Paris, France
- Education: University of Paris
- Known for: Operon model
- Spouses: Lise Bloch (4 children); Geneviève Barrier (m. 1999)
- Awards: Mendel Medal (1962); Grand Prix Charles-Leopold Mayer (1962); Nobel Prize in Physiology or Medicine (1965); Sir Hans Krebs Medal (1982); Lewis Thomas Prize (1994)
- Scientific career
- Fields: Molecular biology

François Jacob (French: [ʒakɔb]; 17 June 1920 – 19 April 2013) was a French biologist. He shared the 1965 Nobel Prize in Physiology or Medicine with Jacques Monod and André Lwoff "for their discoveries concerning genetic control of enzyme and virus synthesis". He and Monod originated the idea that control of enzyme levels in all cells occurs through regulation of transcription. For his work in the French Resistance, he received the Cross of Liberation, the Légion d'honneur and Croix de guerre.

He wrote popular science, and in 1994 received the inaugural Lewis Thomas Prize.

== Early years ==
Jacob was born the only child of Simon, a merchant, and Thérèse (Franck) Jacob, in Nancy, France. An inquisitive child, he learned to read at a young age. Albert Franck, Jacob's maternal grandfather, a four-star general, was Jacob's childhood role model. At seven he entered the Lycée Carnot, where he was schooled for the next ten years; in his autobiography, he describes his impression of it: "a cage". He was antagonized by rightist youth at the Lycée Carnot around 1934. He describes his father as a "conformist in religion", while his mother and other family members important in his childhood were secular Jews; shortly after his bar mitzvah, he became an atheist.

Though interested (and talented) in physics and mathematics, Jacob was horrified at the prospect of spending two additional years in "an even more draconian regime" to prepare for higher study at the Polytechnique. Instead, after observing a surgical operation that cemented his "slight interest" in medicine, he entered medical school.

During the German occupation of France—and on the heels of his mother's death—Jacob left France for Great Britain to join the war effort. Jacob, who had only completed his second year of medical studies, joined the medical company of the French 2nd Armored Division in 1940. He was injured in a German air attack in 1944 and returned to now-liberated Paris on 1 August 1944. For his wartime service, he was awarded France's WWII highest decoration for valor, the Cross of Liberation, as well as Légion d'honneur and Croix de guerre.

After his recovery, Jacob returned to medical school and began researching tyrothricin and learning the methods of bacteriology in the process. He completed a thesis he described as "replicating American work" on the effectiveness of the antibiotic against local infections, and became a medical doctor in 1947. Though attracted to research as a career, he was discouraged by his own perceived ignorance after attending a microbiology congress that summer. Instead, he took a position at the Cabanel Center, where he had done his thesis research; his new work entailed the manufacture of an antibiotic, tyrothricin. Later, the center was contracted to convert gunpowder factories for penicillin production (though this proved impossible).

Also in this period, he met and began courting his future wife, the concert pianist, Lise Bloch. They had four children together. Lise died in 1983 and Jacob married Geneviève Barrier in1999.

== Research ==
In 1958, Monod was watching a film with his wife and told her "I think I’ve just thought up something important." In 1961 Jacob and Monod explored the idea that the control of enzyme expression levels in cells is a result of regulation of transcription of DNA sequences. Their experiments and ideas gave impetus to the emerging field of molecular developmental biology, and of transcriptional regulation in particular.

For many years it had been known that bacterial and other cells could respond to external conditions by regulating levels of their key metabolic enzymes, and/or the activity of these enzymes. For instance, if a bacterium finds itself in a broth containing lactose, rather than the simpler sugar glucose, it must adapt itself to the need to 1) import lactose, 2) cleave lactose to its constituents glucose and galactose, and 3) convert the galactose to glucose. It was known that cells ramp up their production of the enzymes that do these steps when exposed to lactose, rather than wastefully producing these enzymes all the time. Studies of enzyme activity control were progressing through theories of the (allosteric) action of small molecules on the enzyme molecule itself (switching it on or off), but the method of controlling the enzyme production was not well understood at the time.

With the earlier determination of the structure and central importance of DNA, it became clear that all proteins were being produced in some way from its genetic code, and that this step might form a key control point. Jacob and Monod made key experimental and theoretical discoveries that demonstrated that in the case of the lactose system outlined above (in the bacterium E. coli), there are specific proteins that are devoted to repressing the transcription of the DNA to its product (RNA, which in turn is decoded into protein).

This repressor (the lac repressor) is made in all cells, binding directly to DNA at the genes it controls, and physically preventing the transcription apparatus from gaining access to the DNA. In the presence of lactose, some of the lactose is converted to allolactose, which binds to the repressor making it no longer able to bind to DNA, and the transcriptional repression is lifted. In this way, a robust feedback loop is constructed that allows the set of lactose-digesting protein products to be made only when they are needed.

Jacob and Monod extended this repressor model to all genes in all organisms in their initial exuberance. The regulation of gene activity has developed into a very large sub-discipline of molecular biology, and in truth exhibits enormous variety in mechanism and many levels of complexity. Current researchers find regulatory events at every conceivable level of the processes that express genetic information. In the relatively simple genome of baker's yeast, (Saccharomyces cerevisiae), 405 of its 6,419 protein-encoding genes are directly involved in transcriptional control, compared to 1,938 that are enzymes.

== Honours and awards ==
- 1962 Grand Prix Charles-Leopold Mayer by the Académie des Sciences
- 1964 elected to the American Academy of Arts and Sciences
- 1965 Nobel Prize in Physiology or Medicine with André Lwoff and Jacques Monod
- 1969 elected to the United States National Academy of Sciences
- 1969 elected to the American Philosophical Society
- 1973 Elected a Foreign Member of the Royal Society (ForMemRS)
- 1996 Lewis Thomas Prize for Writing about Science
- 1996 Académie Française Seat 38

== See also ==
- List of Jewish Nobel laureates

== Bibliography ==
- Jacob, François; E. L. Wollman. Sexuality and the Genetics of Bacteria. Academic Press, 1961 OCLC 251900319
- Jacob, François. The Possible & The Actual. Pantheon Books, 1982 ISBN 9780295958880
- Jacob, François. The Statue Within: An Autobiography by, translated from the 1987 French edition by Franklin Philip. Basic Books, 1988. ISBN 978-0-465-08223-0; new edition: 9780879694760
- Jacob, François. The Logic of Life. translated from the 1976 French edition by Princeton University Press, 1993 ISBN 0394472462
- Jacob, François. Of Flies, Mice and Men, translated from the French edition and published by Harvard University Press, 1998 ISBN 9780674631113
- Jacob, F.; Perrin, D.; Sánchez, C.; Monod, J.; Edelstein, S. (2005). "The operon: A group of genes with expression coordinated by an operator. C.R.Acad. Sci. Paris 250 (1960) 1727–1729". Comptes Rendus Biologies. 328 (6): 514–520. doi:10.1016/j.crvi.2005.04.005. PMID 15999435.
- Ullmann, A.; Jacob, F.; Monod, J. (1968). "On the subunit structure of wild-type versus complemented beta-galactosidase of Escherichia coli". Journal of Molecular Biology. 32 (1): 1–13. doi:10.1016/0022-2836(68)90140-X. PMID 4868117.
- Ullmann, A.; Jacob, F.; Monod, J. (1967). "Characterization by in vitro complementation of a peptide corresponding to an operator-proximal segment of the beta-galactosidase structural gene of Escherichia coli". Journal of Molecular Biology. 24 (2): 339–343. doi:10.1016/0022-2836(67)90341-5. PMID 5339877.
- Ullmann, A.; Perrin, D.; Jacob, F.; Monod, J. (1965). "Identification, by in vitro complementation and purification, of a peptide fraction of Escherichia coli beta-galactosidase". Journal of Molecular Biology. 12 (3): 918–923. doi:10.1016/S0022-2836(65)80338-2. PMID 4285628.
- Willson, C.; Perrin, D.; Cohn, M.; Jacob, F.; Monod, J. (1964). "Non-Inducible Mutants of the Regulator Gene in the "lactose" System of Escherichia Coli". Journal of Molecular Biology. 8 (4): 582–592. doi:10.1016/S0022-2836(64)80013-9. PMID 14153528.
- Jacob, F.; Ullman, A.; Monod, J. (1964). "The Promotor, A Genetic Element Necessary to the Expression of an Operon". Comptes Rendus Hebdomadaires des Séances de l'Académie des Sciences. 258: 3125–3128. PMID 14143651.
- Jacob, F.; Monod, J. (1964). "Biochemical and Genetic Mechanisms of Regulation in the Bacterial Cell". Bulletin de la Société de Chimie Biologique. 46: 1499–1532. PMID 14270538.
- Monod, J.; Changeux, J.; Jacob, F. (1963). "Allosteric proteins and cellular control systems". Journal of Molecular Biology. 6 (4): 306–329. doi:10.1016/S0022-2836(63)80091-1. PMID 13936070.
- Jacob, F.; Sussman, R.; Monod, J. (1962). "On the nature of the repressor ensuring the immunity of lysogenic bacteria". Comptes Rendus Hebdomadaires des Séances de l'Académie des Sciences. 254: 4214–4216. PMID 14036499.
- Jacob, F.; Monod, J. (1961). "Genetic regulatory mechanisms in the synthesis of proteins". Journal of Molecular Biology. 3 (3): 318–356. doi:10.1016/S0022-2836(61)80072-7. PMID 13718526. S2CID 19804795.
- Monod, J.; Jacob, F. (1961). "Teleonomic mechanisms in cellular metabolism, growth, and differentiation". Cold Spring Harbor Symposia on Quantitative Biology. 26: 389–401. doi:10.1101/sqb.1961.026.01.048. PMID 14475415.
- Perrin, D.; Jacob, F.; Monod, J. (1960). "Induced biosynthesis of a genetically modified protein not presenting affinity for the inductor". Comptes Rendus Hebdomadaires des Séances de l'Académie des Sciences. 251: 155–157. PMID 13734531.
- Buttin, G.; Jacob, F.; Monod, J. (1960). "Constituent synthesis of galactokinase following the development of lambda bacteriophages in Escherichia coli K 12". Comptes Rendus Hebdomadaires des Séances de l'Académie des Sciences. 250: 2471–2473. PMID 13806544.
- Jacob, F.; Perrin, D.; Sánchez, C.; Monod, J. (February 1960). "L'opéron : groupe de gènes à expression coordonnée par un opérateur" [Operon: a group of genes with the expression coordinated by an operator] (PDF). Comptes Rendus Hebdomadaires des Séances de l'Académie des Sciences (Facsimile version reprinted in 2005). 250 (6): 1727–1729. ISSN 0001-4036. PMID 14406329. Archived from the original (PDF) on 4 March 2016.
- Jacob, F.; Monod, J. (1959). "Genes of structure and genes of regulation in the biosynthesis of proteins". Comptes Rendus Hebdomadaires des Séances de l'Académie des Sciences. 249: 1282–1284. PMID 14406327.
- Pardee, A.; Jacob, F.; Monod, J. (1958). "The role of the inducible alleles and the constitutive alleles in the synthesis of beta-galactosidase in zygotes of Escherichia coli". Comptes Rendus Hebdomadaires des Séances de l'Académie des Sciences. 246 (21): 3125–3128. PMID 13547552.
- Jacob, F.; Torriani, A.; Monod, J. (1951). "Effect of ultraviolet rays on the biosynthesis of galactosidase and on the multiplication of T2 bacteriophage in Escherichia coli". Comptes Rendus Hebdomadaires des Séances de l'Académie des Sciences. 233 (20): 1230–1232. PMID 14905606.
