= Arthur Holbrook Wellman =

American politician

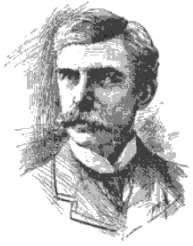

Member of the Massachusetts Senate
- In office 1895–1896

Member of the Massachusetts House of Representatives
- In office 1892–1894

Personal details
- Born: October 30, 1855 East Randolph, Massachusetts
- Died: August 24, 1948 (aged 92) Topsfield, Massachusetts
- Spouse: Jennie Louisa Faulkner (m. 1887)
- Education: Amherst College; Harvard Law School; Boston University School of Law

Arthur Holbrook Wellman (October 30, 1855 – August 24, 1948) was a member of the Massachusetts General Court and a professor at Boston University School of Law.

== Early years ==
Arthur Holbook Wellman was born in East Randolph (now Holbrook), Massachusetts on October 30, 1855, the eldest of four children of Joshua Wyman Wellman and Ellen Maria (Holbrook) Wellman. Joshua was a Congregational church pastor and a great-great-great-great-grandson of Puritan Thomas Wellman, who immigrated to the Massachusetts Bay Colony about 1640. Arthur delivered the valedictory upon graduation from Amherst College in 1878. He then studied at Harvard Law School and graduated from Boston University School of Law in 1882.

== Career ==
Arthur practiced law in Boston. He became a member of the Malden city council in 1885. He married Jennie Louisa Faulkner in Malden on October 11, 1887. They had two children. He represented Malden in the Massachusetts House of Representatives from 1892 through 1894 and in the Massachusetts Senate from 1895 to 1896. He was an instructor and professor of equity jurisprudence and equity pleading at Boston University School of Law from 1886 through 1902. He spent his later years in Topsfield, Massachusetts and died at his home there on August 24, 1948.
