= Mariangela Wallimann-Bornatico =

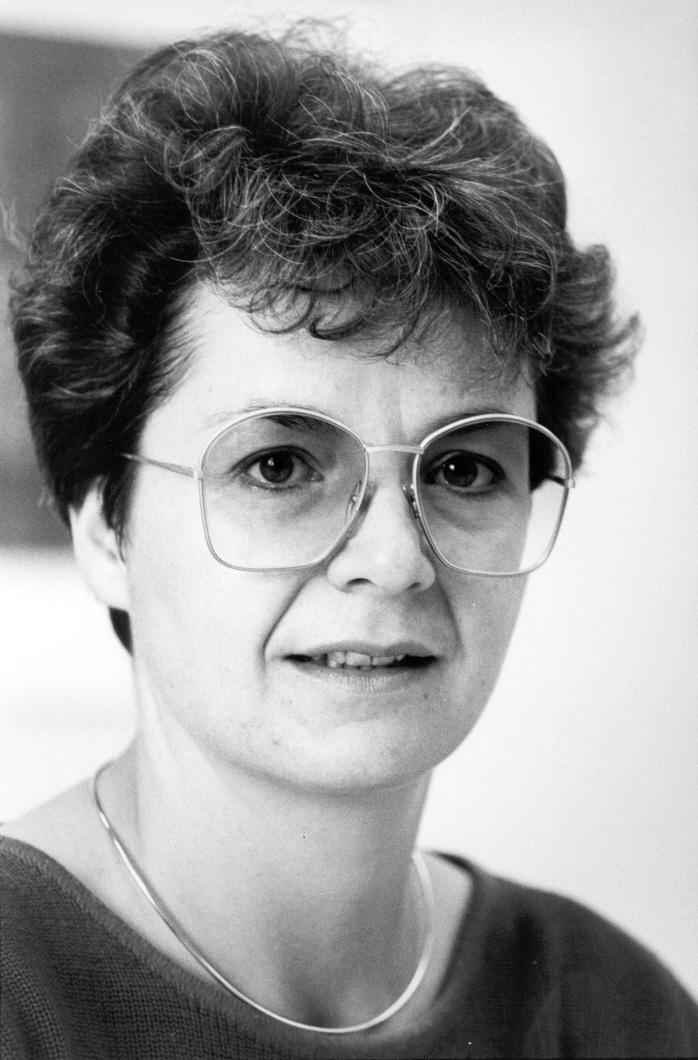
Mariangela Wallimann-Bornatico (1987)

Mariangela Wallimann-Bornatico (born 25 March 1948 in Roveredo, Grisons) is a Swiss jurist. She was the Secretary-General of the Swiss Federal Assembly from 2000 to 2008.

Wallimann-Bornatico worked in various posts in the Swiss federal administration during the 1970s and 80s, including as a personal advisor to Federal Councillor Flavio Cotti. After a stint as deputy press officer of the Swiss Broadcasting Corporation in the 1990s, in 2000 the Federal Assembly elected her to head the Parliamentary Services, the administrative body of the Swiss federal parliament, as secretary-general. She resigned her post in 2008.
