= Otto engine =

Large stationary single-cylinder internal combustion four-stroke engine

This is a video montage of the Otto engines running at the Western Minnesota Steam Threshers Reunion (WMSTR), in Rollag, Minnesota. (2min 16sec, 320×240, 340 kbit/s video)

The Otto engine is a large stationary single-cylinder internal combustion four-stroke engine, designed by the German Nicolaus Otto. It was a low-RPM machine, and only fired every other stroke according to the original version of the Otto cycle, likewise designed by and named for Otto.

== Types ==
Three types of internal combustion engines were designed by German inventors Nicolaus Otto and his partner Eugen Langen. The models were a failed 1862 compression engine, an 1864 atmospheric engine, and the 1876 Otto cycle engine known today as the petrol engine. The engines were initially used for stationary installations, as Otto had no interest in transportation. Other makers such as Daimler perfected the Otto engine for transportation use.

== Timeline ==
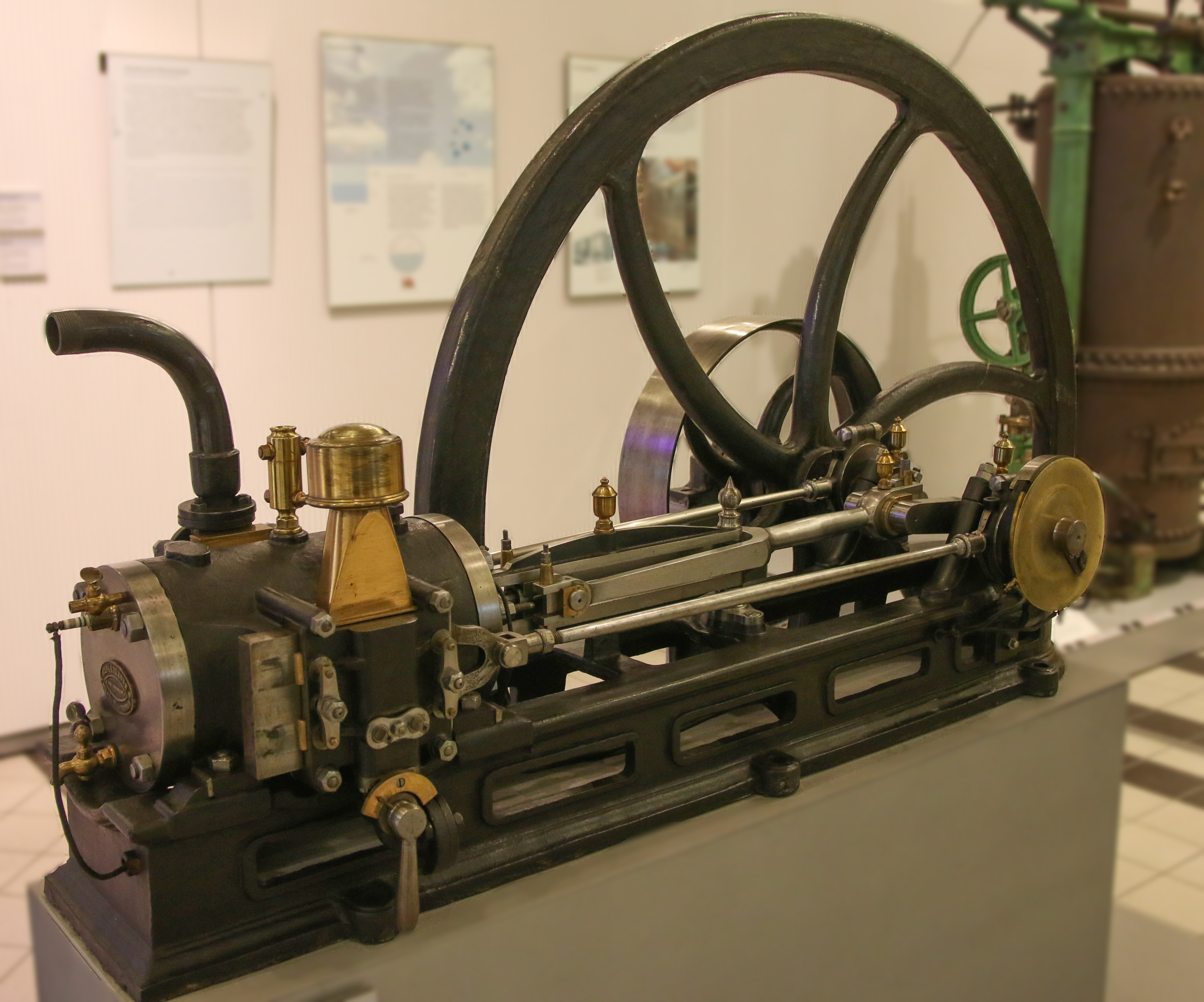
The 1860 Lenoir Engine

Nicolaus August Otto as a young man was a traveling salesman for a grocery concern. In his travels he encountered the internal combustion engine built in Paris by Belgian expatriate Jean Joseph Etienne Lenoir. In 1860, Lenoir succeeded in creating a double-acting engine which ran on illuminating gas at 4% efficiency. The 18-litre (1,100 cu in) Lenoir engine was able to produce only 2 hp (1.5 kW).

In testing a replica of the Lenoir engine in 1861 Otto became aware of the effects of compression on the fuel charge. In 1862 Otto attempted to produce an engine to improve on the poor efficiency and reliability of the Lenoir engine. He tried to create an engine which would compress the fuel mixture prior to ignition, but failed, as that engine would run no more than a few minutes prior to its destruction. Many engineers were also trying to solve the problem with no success.

In 1864, Otto and Eugen Langen founded the first internal combustion engine production company NA Otto and Cie (NA Otto and Company). Otto and Cie succeeded in creating a successful atmospheric engine that same year.

The factory ran out of space and was moved to the town of Deutz, Germany in 1869 where the company was renamed to Gasmotoren-Fabrik Deutz (The Gas Engine Manufacturing Company Deutz).

Gottlieb Daimler was technical director and Wilhelm Maybach was the head of engine design. Daimler was a gunsmith who had also worked on the Lenoir engine previously.

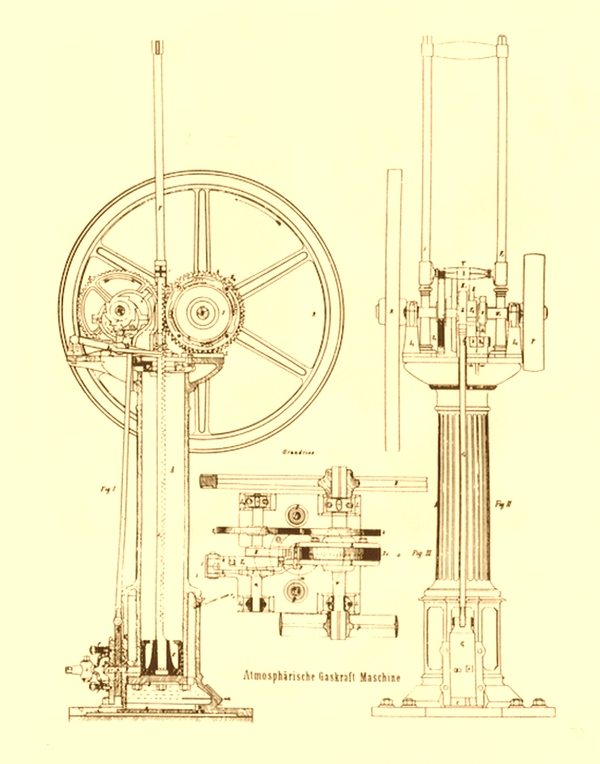
The Otto/Langen atmospheric engine of 1867

By 1876, Otto and Langen succeeded in creating the first internal combustion engine that compressed the fuel mixture prior to combustion for far higher efficiency than any engine created to this time.

== Atmospheric engine ==
The first version of the atmospheric engine used a fluted column design which was the design of Eugen Langen. The atmospheric engine has its power stroke delivered upward using a rack and pinion to convert the piston's linear motion to rotary motion. The expansion ratio of this engine was much more effective than that of the 1860 Lenoir engine and gave the engine its superior efficiency.

The Lenoir engine was an engine that burned fuel without first trying to compress the fuel/mixture. The Otto/Langen atmospheric engine ran at 12% efficiency and produced .5 hp (0.37 kW) at 80 rpm. In competition at the 1867 World's Fair in Paris, it easily bested the efficiency of the Lenoir engine and won the gold medal, thus paving the way for production and sales which funded additional research.

The first version used a frame to stabilize the rack. This was soon dispensed with as the design was simplified. Later engines dispensed with the fluted cylinder as well. The atmospheric engine used a gas flame ignition system and was made in output sizes from 0.25 to 3 hp (0.19 to 2.24 kW).

When in 1872 N.A. Otto & Cie reorganized as Gasmotoren-Fabrik Deutz, management picked Daimler as factory manager, bypassing even Otto, and Daimler joined the company in August, taking Maybach with him as chief designer. While Daimler managed to improve production, the weakness in the Otto's vertical piston design, coupled to Daimler's stubborn insistence on atmospheric engines, led the company to an impasse.

For all its commercial success, with the company producing 634 engines a year by 1875, the Otto and Langen engine had hit a technical dead end: it produced only 3 hp (2.2 kW), yet required 3–4 m (10–13 ft) headroom to operate. In 1882, after producing 2,649 engines, the atmospheric engine production was discontinued. This was also the year that Gottlieb Daimler and Wilhelm Maybach left the company.

== The Otto cycle ==
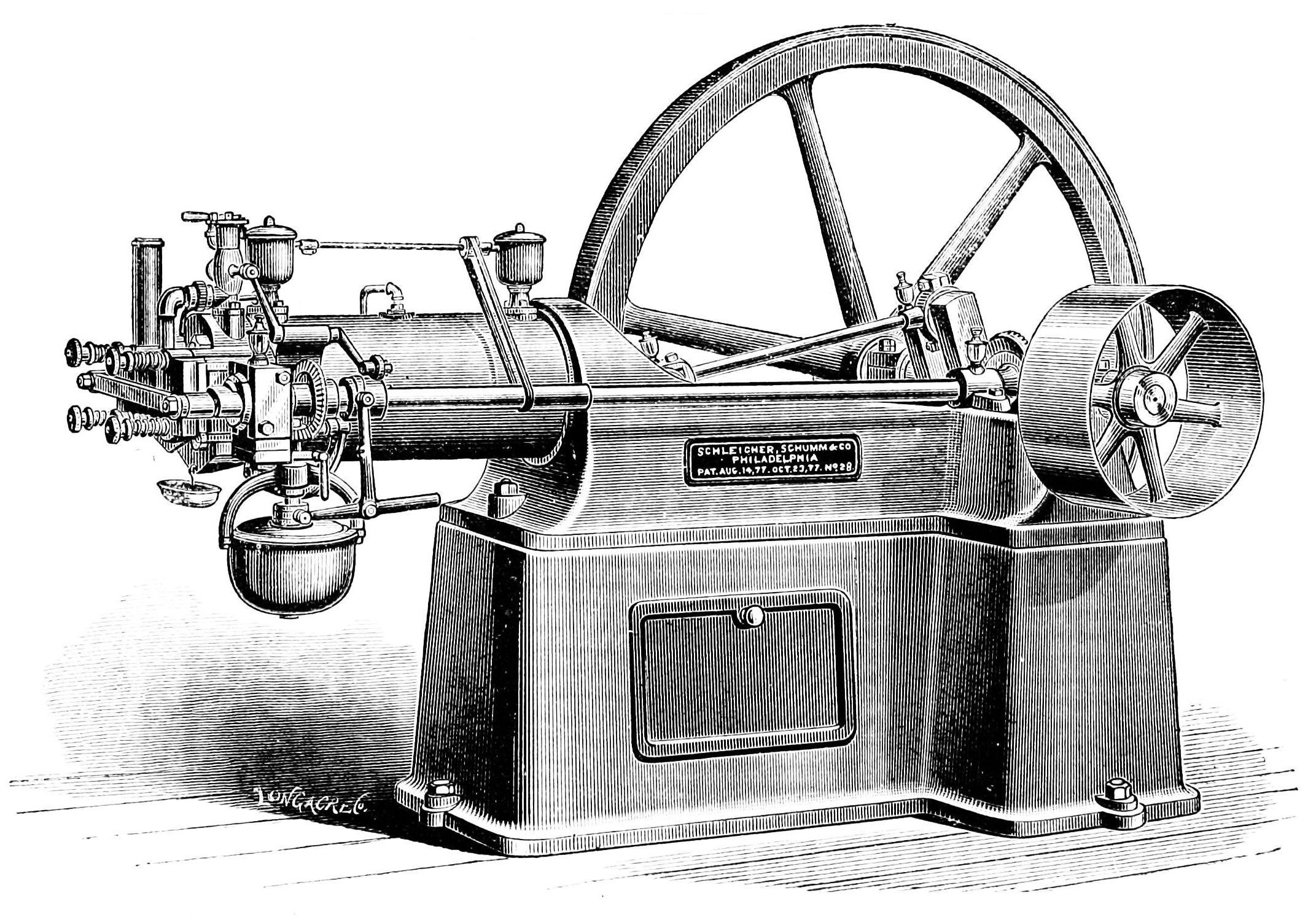
An 1880s era American Otto engine for stationary use

After 14 years of research and development, Otto succeeded in creating the compressed charge internal combustion engine 9 May 1876. Otto found a way to layer the fuel mixture into the cylinder to cause the fuel to burn in a progressive, as opposed to explosive fashion. He referred to this as being a layered or stratified charge. This resulted in controlled combustion and a longer push of the piston in the cylinder rather than the explosion which destroyed all the engines attempted previously. The fuel was still illuminating gas just as Lenoir's and his own atmospheric engines had used.

This engine used four cycles in its creation of power. It is known now as the Otto Cycle engine. This is the same engine that was first attempted in 1862.

Otto turned his attention to the 4-stroke cycle largely due to the efforts of Franz Rings and Herman Schumm, brought into the company by Gottlieb Daimler. It is this engine (the Otto Silent Engine), and not the Otto & Langen engine, to which the Otto cycle refers. This was the first commercially successful engine to use in-cylinder compression (as patented by William Barnett in 1838). The Rings-Schumm engine appeared in autumn 1876 and was immediately successful.

The cylinder arrangement of the compression engine was horizontal. It featured a slider valve control with gas flame ignition, which overcame the problems that Lenoir could not overcome with electric ignition which was unreliable at that time. In the 15 years prior to the development of the Otto engine power output never exceeded 3 hp (2.2 kW). In a few years after the Otto engine was developed engine power rose until it reached 1,000 hp (750 kW).

The Otto Cycle engine was eventually adopted to run on Ligroin and eventually petrol and many gases. During WWII, Otto engines were run on more than 62 different fuels, such as wood gas, coal gas, propane, hydrogen, benzene, and many more. The engine is limited to light fuels. A later development of this engine, known as the Diesel engine, can burn heavy fuels and oils.

=== Carburetor and low voltage Ignition ===
Deutz also developed the carburetor and a reliable low voltage ignition system in 1884. This allowed the use of liquid petroleum fuel for the first time and made the use of the engine in transportation feasible. This work was conducted in parallel to the work of Gottlieb Daimler and Wilhelm Maybach who also developed a carburetor which replaced the original hot tube ignition on the Daimler Reitwagen, and a magneto ignition system which formed the basis of the magneto of the Robert Bosch Corporation. Daimler continued the development of Otto's engine for transportation while Deutz switched to Diesel engines.

=== Loss of a patent ===
In 1886, the German patent office nullified the Deutz patent that would have run until 1891 due to the discovery of a previous patent for a four-cycle engine by Frenchman Alphonse Beau de Rochas. Deutz was unable to show that his stratified charge induction system was unlike that described in the de Rochas patent and lost his monopoly and one of his 25 patents. By 1889 more than 50 companies were manufacturing Otto design engines.

== Stationary engines ==
=== Spark plug firing ===
Otto engines were equipped with a number of different mechanism designs to trigger sparking. The Otto is one of the first engines to use a spark plug, which is a device that produces a small electric spark to ignite the fuel charge. This usually consisted of a pivoting trip-arm that briefly grabs a power switch lever and gives it a quick pull. The switch lever is then released and allowed to snap back to its original position in preparation for the next cycle. This system requires an external electric battery, ignition coil, and electric charging system similar to modern automobile engines.

Later Otto engines employed a small magneto directly on the engine. Rather than tripping a switch, the spark plug firing arm applies a quick rotation to the magneto rotor, which then snaps back under spring tension. This quick rotation of the magneto coil produces a very brief current flow that fires the spark plug and ignites the fuel. This design has the advantage of requiring no external battery, and is how modern portable gas engines operate, incorporating the magnet portion of the magneto into the flywheel. Modern portable engines excite the magneto with every flywheel rotation, and so use a cam-operated electric switch to prevent plug firing except for the power stroke of the engine (see wasted spark).

=== Engine speed regulation ===
How the governor regulates engine speed on an Otto engine. This particular engine operates on natural gas; the large disk-shaped object below the engine is the gas pressure regulator. (22sec, 320×240, 320 kbit/s video)

Close-up view of the governor wheel either riding up over the fuel intake cam or sliding to the right and coasting (14sec, 320×240, 250 kbit/s video)

This is a demonstration of how the speed regulation works in the Otto engine. The spinning balls are the centrifugal governor, and as the machine runs slower the small wheel moves to the left, inserting the rod into the nearby roller and pushing it up to trigger the intake of fuel to fire the engine for one revolution.

If the machine is under load and still running too slowly, the cam continues to stay inserted and makes the engine fire repeatedly for each ignition cycle. When the engine speed increases, the governor pulls the small wheel to the right and the machine coasts without injecting any fuel, though the spark plug continues to fire with no fuel in the cylinder.

This method of speed-control is often referred to as the Hit or Miss method because the engine mis-fires (for lack of fuel-mixture) on those power-strokes where the engine is running faster than the governed speed, but will hit (fire) on power strokes where the speed is too low. No fuel is used on the mis-fire strokes.

=== Cylinder cooling ===
Otto engines use a flowing water jacket around the cylinder wall, similar to modern engine cooling systems. The stationary Otto engines on display at the Western Minnesota Steam Threshers Reunion all share a single large heat radiator outside the building. This centralized distant heat dissipation system also helps to keep the engine building cool.

== First use in transportation ==
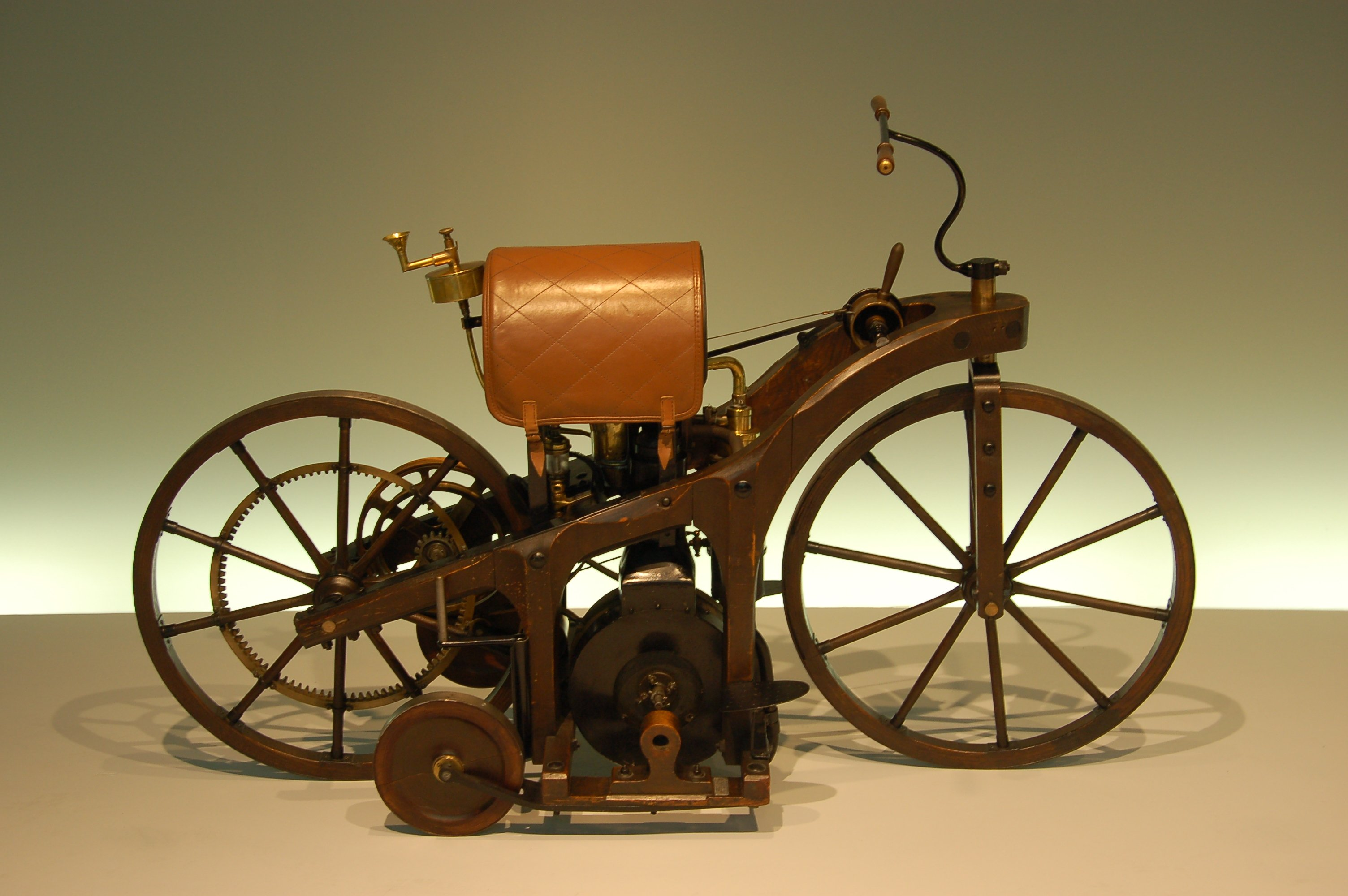
1885 Daimler's Petroleum Reitwagen

Otto and his manager Gottlieb Daimler had a disagreement on the future direction of the Otto engine. While Otto wanted to produce large engines for stationary applications, Daimler wanted to produce engines small enough to be used in transportation. After a period of disagreement Daimler left Otto's employ in 1882 and took Wilhelm Maybach with him. In 1883, Daimler and Maybach created a 0.5-horsepower (0.37 kW) engine that was small and efficient.

In 1885, Daimler and Maybach created the "Grandfather Clock" engine, partly inspired by Otto's ideas, and built a two-wheeled frame around it. It was the first high-speed petrol engine. Daimler's son Paul was the first person to ride on this motorized bicycle, the Daimler Reitwagen, which is the first internal combustion engined motor vehicle.

Deutz continued to produce large stationary engines, while Daimler moved onto boats, airships, locomotives, automobiles, trucks, and other transportation uses. Deutz is the world's oldest engine producer. The company of Daimler and Maybach, Daimler Motoren Gesellschaft, later merged with Benz to form Daimler-Benz, adopting Mercedes-Benz as its automobile trademark.

Otto's company, Deutz AG, is one of the largest engine-producing companies worldwide. Otto cycle engines are ubiquitous across different automobile classes and manufacturers.
