= Wellmann =

Wellmann is a German surname. Notable people with the surname include:

- Allan Wellmann (born 1954), Guatemalan footballer
- Ambera Wellmann (born 1982), Canadian artist
- Dieter Wellmann (born 1942), German fencer
- Ellen Wellmann (born 1948), German middle and long-distance runner
- Ernst Wellmann (1904–1970), German Wehrmacht officer
- Paul-Heinz Wellmann (born 1952), West German middle-distance runner

== See also ==
- Wellman (disambiguation)
