= Anna =

Anna may refer to:

== People ==
=== Surname and given name ===
- Anna (name), a given name and surname and also, list of people and fictional characters with the name

=== Mononym ===
- Anna (goddess), the main deity in Old Assyrian Kanesh
- Anna the Prophetess, in the Gospel of Luke
- Anna of East Anglia, King (died c.654)
- Anna (wife of Artabasdos) (fl. 715–773)
- Anna (daughter of Boris I) (9th–10th century)
- Anna (Anisia) (fl. 1218 to 1221)
- Anna of Poland, Countess of Celje (1366–1425)
- Anna of Cilli (1386–1416)
- Anna, Grand Duchess of Lithuania (died 1418)
- Anne of Austria, Landgravine of Thuringia (1432–1462)
- Anna of Nassau-Dillenburg (died 1514)
- Anna, Duchess of Prussia (1576–1625)
- Anna of Russia (1693–1740)
- Anna, Lady Miller (1741–1781)
- Anna Russell, Duchess of Bedford (1783–1857)
- Anna, Lady Barlow (1873–1965)
- Anna (feral child) (1932–1942)
- Anna (rapper) (born 2003)
- Anna (singer) (born 1987)
- C. N. Annadurai (1909–1969), Indian politician, known as Anna (elder brother)
- Sunil Shetty (born 1961), Indian actor, known by his nickname Anna

== Places ==
=== Australia ===
- Hundred of Anna, a cadastral district in South Australia

=== Iran ===
- Anna, Fars, a village in Fars Province
- Anna, Kohgiluyeh and Boyer-Ahmad, a village in Kohgiluyeh and Boyer-Ahmad Province

=== Russia ===
- Anna, Voronezh Oblast, an urban locality in Voronezh Oblast
- Anna, Russia, a list of inhabited localities

=== United States ===
- Anna, Arkansas
- Anna, Georgia
- Anna, Kentucky
- Anna, Illinois
- Anna, Ohio
- Anna, Texas
- Lake Anna, Virginia

=== Other places ===
- Anna River (disambiguation)
- Anna (Iraq), a former name of Anah in Iraq
- Anna Cave, a natural limestone cave in Miskolc-Lillafüred, Hungary
- Anna, Estonia, a village in Paide Parish, Järva County, Estonia
- Anna, Latvia, a village in the Alūksne district, Latvia
- Anna Nagar, a neighborhood of Chennai, India
  - Anna Nagar (State Assembly Constituency)
  - Anna Nagar (Chennai Suburban Railway), railway station
  - Anna Nagar West
  - Anna Nagar East metro station
- Anna Paulowna, a municipality and town in the Netherlands
- Anna Regina, the capital of the Pomeroon-Supenaam Region of Guyana
- Anna Salai, an arterial road in Chennai, India
- Anna, Valencia, Spain
- Anna Valley, a village in Hampshire, UK

== Art and media ==
=== Film ===
- Anna (1951 film), Italian film directed by Alberto Lattuada
- Anna (1964 film), Indian Malayalam film directed by K. S. Sethumadhavan
- Anna (1967 film), French film starring Anna Karina
- Anna (1970 film), Finnish film starring Harriet Andersson
- Anna (1987 film), American film about a Czech actress in New York City
- Anna, 1988, script-supervised by Mary Cybulski
- Anna (1994 film), Indian Telugu film directed by Muthyala Subbaiah starring Rajasekhar, Roja and Gauthami
- Anna (2013 film), a psychological thriller that was originally released as Mindscape
- Anna (2015 Canadian film)
- Anna (2015 Colombian film)
- Anna (2016 film), an Indian film based on the life of Anna Hazare
- Anna (2019 feature film), a French film by Luc Besson
- Anna (2019 short film), a live-action short film
- Anna: 6–18, 1993 documentary by Nikita Mikhalkov
- Words of War, working title Anna, 2025

=== Television ===
- Anna (German TV series), a 1987 German television series
- Anna (Italian TV series), a 2021 Italian television series
- Anna (South Korean TV series), a 2022 South Korean television series
- Anna (2023 TV series), a 2023 Indian Tamil television series
- "Anna" (Not Going Out), a 2014 episode

=== Literature ===
- Anna (magazine), a defunct weekly Italian women's fashion magazine
- Anna (Finnish magazine)
- Anna, a novel by Niccolò Ammaniti

=== Music ===
- Anna Records, early Motown label
- ANNA (band), a Ukrainian nu-metal band
- Anna (Anna Waronker album), 2002
- Anna (The Courteeners album), 2013
- "Anna" (The Cribs song)
- "Anna (Go to Him)", a 1962 song by Arthur Alexander, later covered by The Beatles
- "Anna" (Toto song), 1988
- "Anna", a 2015 song by Will Butler from Policy
- "Anna", a 2011 song by Charlotte Gainsbourg from Stage Whisper
- "Anna", a 1984 song by APO Hiking Society from Feet on the Ground
- "Anna", a 1975 song by Bad Company from Straight Shooter
- "Anna", a 1970 song by Lucio Battisti
- "Anna", a song by Stone Sour from Audio Secrecy
- "Anna – Letmein Letmeout" and "Anna – Lassmichrein Lassmichraus", 1982 songs by Trio
- "Anna" originally "El Negro Zumbón", theme for the 1951 film Anna

=== Other arts and media ===
- For characters named Anna, see Anna (name)
- Anna (Frozen), a character in the 2013 Disney animated film Frozen
- Anna (video game), a 2012 psychological horror game
- An early name for Morgause of Arthurian legend
- The sister of Dido, Queen of Carthage, in Roman mythology and later literature

== Science ==
- Anna (apple), a cultivar of domesticated apple
- Anna (dog), first survivor of experimental pulmonary bypass surgery
- Anna (gastropod), a genus of sea snails
- Anna (plant), a genus of flowering plants in the family Gesneriaceae

== Vehicles ==
- Anna (ship), a 1739 merchant vessel
- Anna (1790 ship) or Bombay Anna, a British East India Company (EIC) ship
- Anna (1793 ship) or Bengal Anna, a British East India Company (EIC) ship
- Anna (1912 automobile), a defunct automobile of unknown origin
- MV Anna, a 1940 Kriegsmarine coastal tanker

== Other uses ==
- Anna (era) (安和, An'na), a Japanese era from 968 to 970
- Anna University, an engineering university with a number of affiliates in Tamil Nadu, India
- Abkhazian Network News Agency, a news agency in the breakaway Abkhazian Republic
- Anna (monetary subunit), a currency unit (coin) formerly used in India
- Pommes Anna, or Anna potatoes, a classic French potato dish
- ANNA, Association of national numbering agencies

== See also ==
- , including many people with forename Anna
- Ana (disambiguation)
- Anni (disambiguation)
- Ann (disambiguation)
- Anne (disambiguation)
- Annie (disambiguation)
- Annah (disambiguation)
- Annayya (disambiguation)
- Anya, a given name
- Hannah (name), a given name
- Santa Ana (disambiguation)
