= Holyman =

Holyman is an English surname.

== Notable people ==
- Hazel Holyman, Australian air hostess (1899–1992)
- Ivan Nello Holyman, Australian aviation executive (1896–1957)
- John Holyman, Bishop of Bristol (1495–1558)
- Josef Holyman, Australian cricketer (born 1970)
- Sophie Holyman, Australian rugby league footballer (born 1997)
- Victor Holyman, Australian aviator (1894–1934)
- William Holyman, Australian mariner (1833–1919)
- William Holyman Jr., Australian businessman (1858–1921)

== Other uses ==
- Holyman family
- Holyman (company)
- Holyman House

== See also ==
- Holman (surname)
- Holeman
- Hollman
