= Ana =

Ana or ANA may refer to:

== People ==
- Ana (given name), a list of people with the name
- Ana people or Atakpame people, an ethnic group of West Africa
- ana (gamer), Anathan Pham, an Australian professional Dota 2 player known as ana

== Places ==
- Ana, Kohgiluyeh and Boyer-Ahmad, village in Iran
- Ana or Anah, town in Iraq
- Ana, populated place in Morobe Province, Papua New Guinea
- Ana or Anié, town in Togo
- Ana, community in Niue

== Arts and entertainment ==
- Ana (1982 film), a Portuguese film
- Ana (2020 film), an American film
- The Hole (1957 film) or Ana, a 1957 Japanese film
- Ana (1984 TV series), a Pakistani drama on PTV
- Ana (2004 TV series), a Pakistani drama on Geo TV
- Ana (2020 TV series), a Mexican comedy show
- ana (2021 TV series), Syrian TV series starring Taim Hasan
- "Ana", a song by the Pixies from Bossanova
- Ana (Ralph Towner album), 1996
- Ana (Ana album), 1987
- Ana (Overwatch), a player character in the video games Overwatch and Heroes of the Storm
- Ana (Mother), a character in the original Mother video game
- Ana, a character from the WarioWare series

== Businesses ==
- AB Nyköpings Automobilfabrik, a Swedish auto manufacturer
- African News Agency, a news agency of South Africa
- All Nippon Airways, a Japanese airline
- Athens News Agency, the national news agency of Greece
- Australian National Airways, a defunct airline
- Ana Book Store, a used bookstore in Singapore

== Organizations ==
=== Military ===
- Afghan National Army
- Albanian National Army

=== Other organizations ===
- Administration for Native Americans, a program in the Administration for Children and Families
- Agency for New Americans, a refugee organization in Boise, Idaho
- Agência Nacional de Águas, the Brazilian National Water Agency
- All Nippon Airways, Japanese airline
- Alliance for Nuclear Accountability, a network of organizations collaborating on issues of nuclear weapons production and waste cleanup
- American Numismatic Association
- American Nurses Association
- ANA Aeroportos de Portugal, an airport authority
- Association of National Advertisers
- Association of Naval Aviation, one of the sponsors of the Wesley L. McDonald Leadership Award
- Associazione Nazionale Alpini, the Italian National Alpini Association
- Australian National Alliance, a far-right political party active from 1978 to 1981
- Australian Natives' Association, a mutual sickness benefit society for white Australians founded in 1871
- American Neurological Association, a professional society of academic neurologists and neuroscientists

== Science and technology ==
- Anti-nuclear antibody, an autoantibody that binds to contents of the cell nucleus
- Ana (mathematics), a name proposed for a direction in the fourth spatial dimension
- Ana (programming language)
- Anorexia nervosa or ana
- Anandamide, a neurotransmitter
- The basal angiosperms, the earliest-diverging flowering plant lineages, sometimes referred to as the "ANA grade" after the group's three orders Amborellales, Nymphaeales, and Austrobaileyales

== Other uses ==
- Anaheim Ducks, a National Hockey League team; based in Anaheim, California, US
- Ana River, river in Oregon, US
- -ana, a Latinate suffix to form a mass noun
- List of storms named Ana, tropical and extratropical storms named Ana
- Ana tree, a hardwood tree native to Africa and the Middle East
- Ana (search dog) (1995–2008)
- ANA (motorcycle), Australian motorcycle
- Authorised Neutral Athletes, Russian athletes who can compete at international athletic competitions after the doping scandal
- Anaheim Regional Transportation Intermodal Center (in California, USA) (Amtrak code "ANA")

== See also ==
- Ak Ana, a goddess in Turkic mythology
- Anna (disambiguation)
