= Hazel Holyman =

Australian air hostess (1899–1992)

Hazel Holyman AM
- Born: Hazel Gaunt; 17 March 1899; Launceston, Tasmania, Australia
- Died: 14 November 1992 (aged 93); Launceston, Tasmania, Australia
- Other name: "Matron" Holyman
- Spouse: Victor Holyman (m. 1921; died 1934)
- Family: Holyman family

Hazel "Matron" Holyman AM (née Gaunt; 17 March 1899 – 14 November 1992) was the first air hostess in Australia.

== Early life ==
Hazel Gaunt was born on 17 March 1899 in Launceston, Tasmania. She was the oldest of four children born to clerk Frederick Archer Gaunt and Mary Emmeline Gaunt. She attended Broadland House Church of England Girls' Grammar School. On 22 August 1921, she married aviator Victor Clive Holyman, a member of the Holyman family.

== Holyman's Airways ==
In 1932, Victor Holyman and his brother Ivan founded the airline Holyman Bros Pty Ltd, which was eventually named Holyman's Airways Ltd. Victor was the airline's sole pilot and Hazel was its only air hostess. She was the first air hostess in Australia. The engineer Jack Stubbs completed the airline's crew. As hostess, Hazel did not initially travel onboard flights. Instead, she was responsible for driving passengers to Launceston Airport, and providing them with blankets, biscuits, and a vacuum flask of tea or coffee for their flight. Despite her career in aviation, she was not fond of flying.

On 19 October 1934, Victor Holyman died when Miss Hobart, the airline's new De Havilland Express, crashed over the Bass Strait. Victor died, along with his co-pilot and all nine passengers onboard the flight. After her husband's death, Hazel left the airline while she grieved. In 1937, she left Australia to travel throughout the United States and United Kingdom.

== Australian National Airways ==
In 1936, Holyman's Airways became Australian National Airways (ANA). The airline was the first in Australia to employ in-flight hostesses. In 1939, Holyman's brother-in-law Ivan asked her to return and take up a position as Superintendent of Air Hostesses. Before returning to Australia, Holyman visited air hostess schools in England, Holland, and the United States. She found that American airlines, like United Airlines, had dedicated training schools for air hostesses and employed hundreds of hostesses. Holyman hoped to replicate that in Australia. Her service with ANA marked the beginning of formal training and policies for Australian air hostesses.

Holyman designed the uniforms used by ANA air hostesses. The first uniforms were navy blue with brass buttons to match the uniforms worn by pilots. She later changed the uniforms to be French grey with non-brass buttons, so that the air hostesses would not have to spend time polishing the buttons on their uniforms.

As hostess superintendent, Holyman was responsible for training hostesses, overseeing laundry, and planning meals provided to passengers in-flight and at the Essendon passenger hotel. She flew to different states to interview potential hostesses, and had a reputation for expecting perfection from her employees, who nicknamed her "Matron Holyman". Holyman believed the nickname was meant to distinguish her from the other members of the Holyman family working at the airline, it also paralleled the title of nursing matron. Air hostesses were originally not provided with in-flight meals by ANA, but this changed at the insistence of Holyman. If an air hostess did not turn up for duty in time, Holyman took her place as hostess onboard the scheduled flight.

Holyman enforced an atmosphere of discipline and personability among ANA air hostesses, believing that their job was to represent the airline to the public and to maintain a calm environment while in the air so as to reassure nervous passengers. She preferred for hostesses to appear tidy and efficient rather than "glamorous". Among ANA employees, Holyman had a reputation of being able to spot whether a hostess had an unpressed or crooked uniform from fifty paces away.

There were 18 air hostesses at ANA when Holyman became air hostess superintendent, and 200 were working there by the time she retired in 1955. Most air hostesses at ANA served for no more than two years, and Holyman trained over 1,000 hostesses before retiring.

== Retirement ==
Holyman was patron of the Down to Earth Club for former ANA flight hostesses from 1966 until her death. In 1980, Holyman was made a member of the Order of Australia (AM). In 1988, she received an Advance Australia Award for services to aviation. She died in Launceston on 14 November 1992.
