= Holy man =

Holy man is a person, usually an ascetic, who is exceptionally pious or religious.

Holy man or Holyman may also refer to:

== Film ==
- Holy Man, a 1998 film starring Eddie Murphy
- The Holy Man, a 2005 Thai comedy film
- Mahapurush, or The Holy Man, a 1965 film by Satyajit Ray

== Music ==
- Holy Man (album), a 2000 album by Joe Lynn Turner

=== Songs ===
- "Holy Man", a 1968 song released as a single by Scott McKenzie
- "Holy Man", a song by Deep Purple from their 1974 album Stormbringer
- "Holy Man", an instrumental song by Dennis Wilson, recorded during the Pacific Ocean Blue sessions
- "Holy Man", a song by Paul Weller on the 1993 album Wild Wood
- "Holy Man", a song by One Minute Silence from their 2000 album Buy Now... Saved Later
- "Holyman", a song by Blind Melon on the 1992 album Blind Melon

== Other uses ==
- Holyman (disambiguation)
- Holyman (company), an Australian company that operated cargo ships and ferries in Australia and other countries
- Holyman House, an iconic Art Deco building in the central business district of Launceston, Tasmania, Australia

== See also ==
- Holman (surname), which can mean "holy man"
