= Passion Flower (disambiguation) =

Passion flower most commonly refers to Passiflora, a genus of flowering plants.

Passion Flower may also refer to:

- Dolores Ibárruri, known as "La Pasionaria" (English: "the Passionflower")
- The Passion Flower (1912 film), a short starring Laura Sawyer
- Heart of Juanita, also known as The Passion Flower, a 1919 film starring Beatriz Michelena
- The Passion Flower, a 1921 film featuring Norma Talmadge
- Passion Flower (1930 film), starring Kay Francis
- Passionflower (1952 film), a Mexican crime drama film
- Passionflower (2011 film), a Canadian film
- "The Passion Flower", a song by Irving Berlin
- Passion Flower, a novel by Kathleen Norris and the basis of the 1930 film
- Passion Flowers, a book by Annah Robinson Watson
- "Passion Flower", a 1971 song by the rock band Stoneground
