= Holyman family =

Australian business family

- Country: Australia
- Founder: William Holyman

Members of the Holyman family were historically prominent in Australian industry, particularly shipping and transportation. They at one time owned multiple islands in the Bass Strait.

== History ==
The family was founded by William Holyman, an English mariner who established the William Holyman & Sons shipping company in Australia in the 19th century.

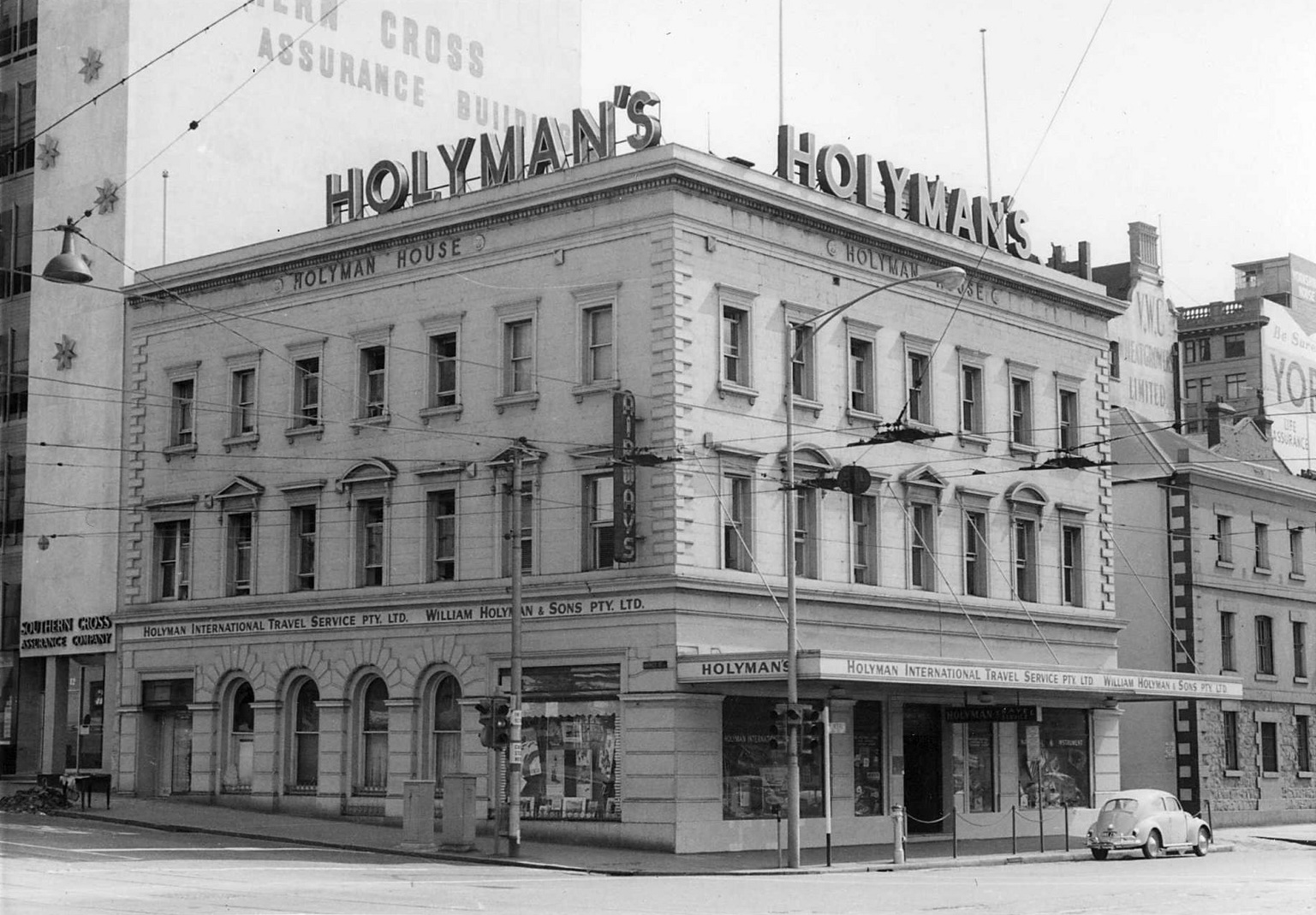
Holyman House, Melbourne, photographed in December 1963.

Holyman had four children, thirty-one grandchildren, and eighteen great-grandchildren. The family's shipping, mail delivery, and passenger transportation enterprise expanded to include automobiles and aviation. Members of the family founded timber mills, hotels, food processing businesses, and car dealerships throughout Australia. In 1910, they established King Island Steamers.

Beginning in 1907, the Holymans began purchasing grazing land in the Bass Strait islands. They first purchased Waterhouse Island and Twenty Day Island (also called Ninth Island). By 1911, they had 27,000 acres of land in the islands. The family purchased Robbins Island and Walker Island in 1916. Robbins Island was later sold to cattle rancher Eugene Hammond, who had married Mary Holyman. The Holymans purchased Trefoil Island in 1926, selling it in 1948. In 1986, the family established a winery in the Tamar Valley, Tasmania.

The shipping company William Holyman & Sons was sold by the family to Thomas Nationwide Transport in the 1970s. The company was spun-off from Thomas Nationwide Transport under the name Holyman in 1994, before being acquired by the Patrick Corporation in 2000. The last vessel privately owned by the Holyman family was the Mary Holyman, which stopped trading in 1987.

=== Australian National Airways ===
In 1932, William Holyman's great-grandsons Victor Holyman and Ivan Nello Holyman established Holyman's Airways Ltd, which became Australian National Airways. In 1934, Victor died in an aviation accident while flying over the Bass Strait. The company was acquired by Ansett Australia in 1956.

== Prominent members ==
- William Holyman (1833–1919), founder of the family
- William Holyman Jr. (1858–1921), mariner and shipping magnate
- Victor Holyman (1894–1934), cofounder of Australian National Airways
- Ivan Holyman (1896–1957), cofounder of Australian National Airways
- Hazel Holyman (1899–1992), air hostess and wife of Victor Holyman

== Buildings ==
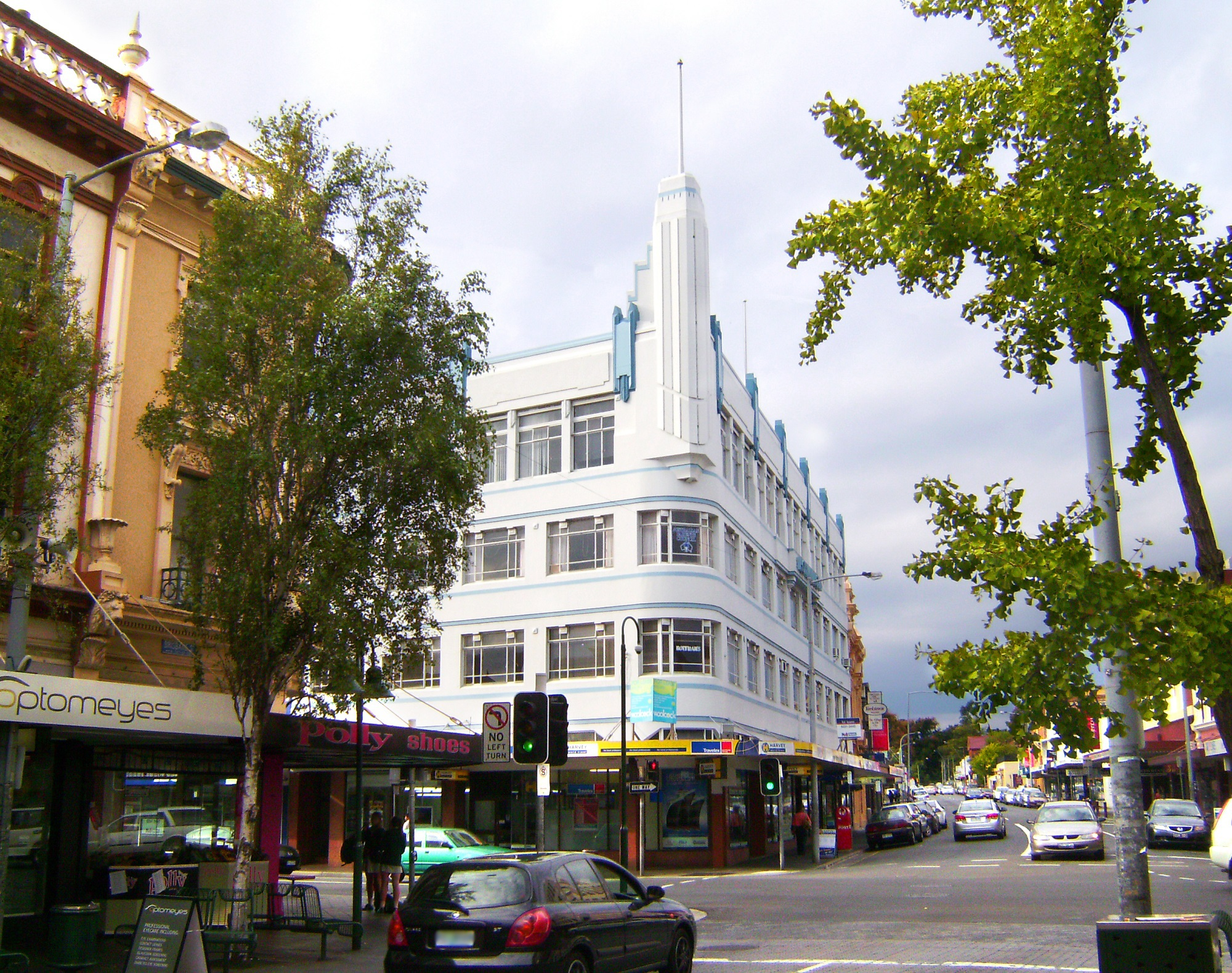
Holyman House, Launceston in 2007

- Holyman House, a 1937 Art Deco commercial building in Launceston, Tasmania. The building is noted for its streamlined architectural detailing and for its role as the original headquarters of Australian National Airways.
- Holyman House, Melbourne, an 1858 bluestone commercial building located at the corner of Flinders Street and Market Street. Known as Holyman House since at least the 1950s, the building was originally constructed for the wool-exporting firm Goldsborough Mort and was designed by architect John Gill.
- Holyman House, Hobart, located at 5 Morrison Street, is a two-storey commercial building constructed in 1935. It was the first building in Hobart to incorporate locally produced red granite, sourced from a quarry at Coles Bay. The building was designed by architects H. S. East and Roy Sharrington Smith, with construction undertaken by Hobart contractor H. M. Pease.
