= Annah =

Annah may refer to:

== People with the given name ==
- Annah Faulkner, Australian novelist
- Annah Gela, South African politician
- Annah Mac, New Zealand singer-songwriter, producer and musician
- Annah May Soule, American academic
- Annah Robinson Watson, American author

== Other uses ==
- Annah-of-the-Shadows, a character from the 1999 role-playing video game Planescape: Torment
- Ida Annah Ryan, American architect

== See also ==
- Anah, Iraq
- Anah District, Iraq
- Anah (biblical figure)
- Anna (disambiguation)
