= Australian National =

Australian National may refer to:

- the official trading name of the Australian National Railways Commission, railway operator in Australia from 1975 to 1998

or, informally, for:

- Australian National Airways, airline in Australia from 1936 to 1957
- Australian National Botanic Gardens in Canberra
- Australian National Maritime Museum in Sydney
- Australian National University in Canberra.
