= Dorsett Golden =

Apple cultivar

'Dorsett Golden' apple
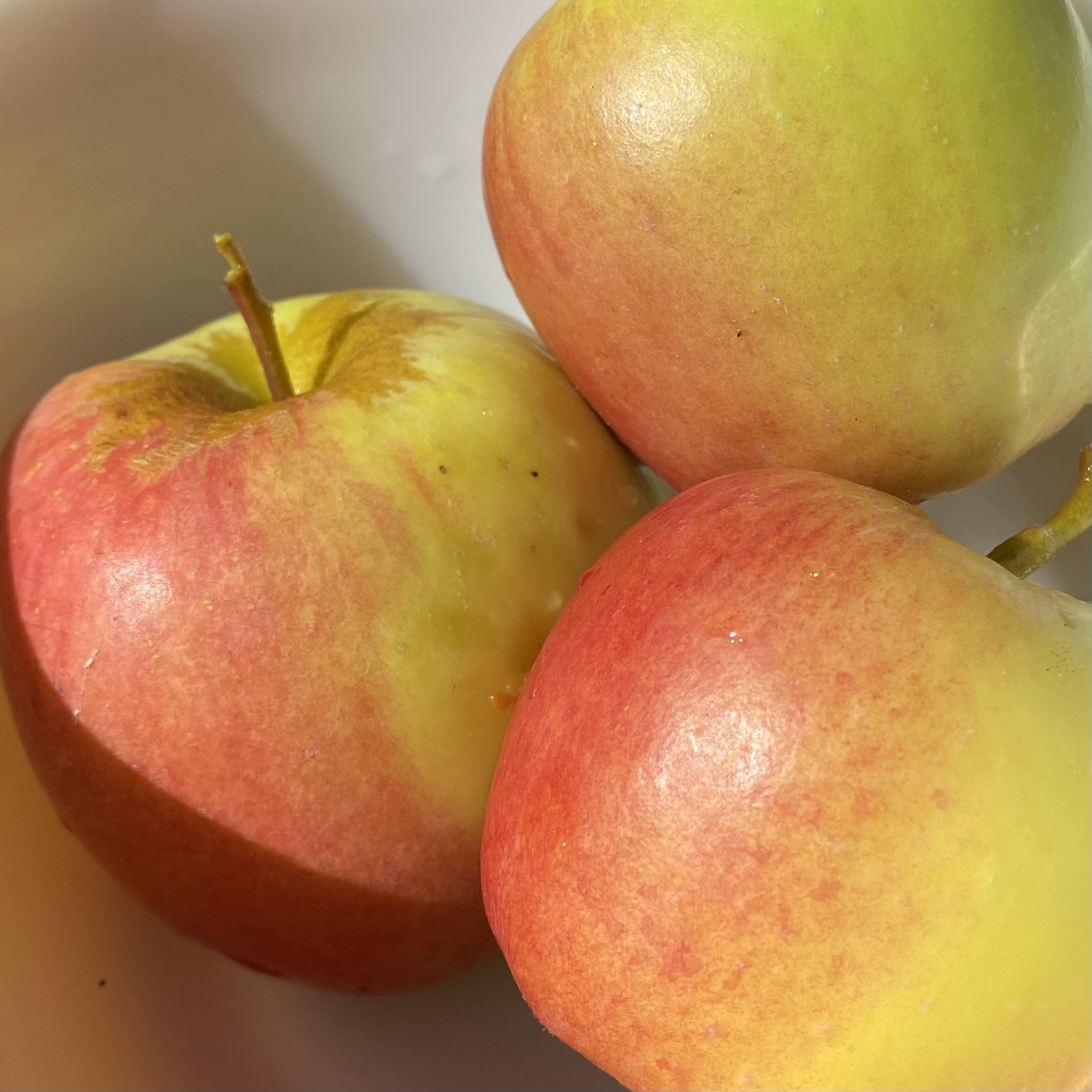
- Genus: Malus
- Species: M. domestica
- Hybrid parentage: 'Golden Delicious' × unknown
- Cultivar: 'Dorsett Golden'
- Origin: Bahamas, around 1950

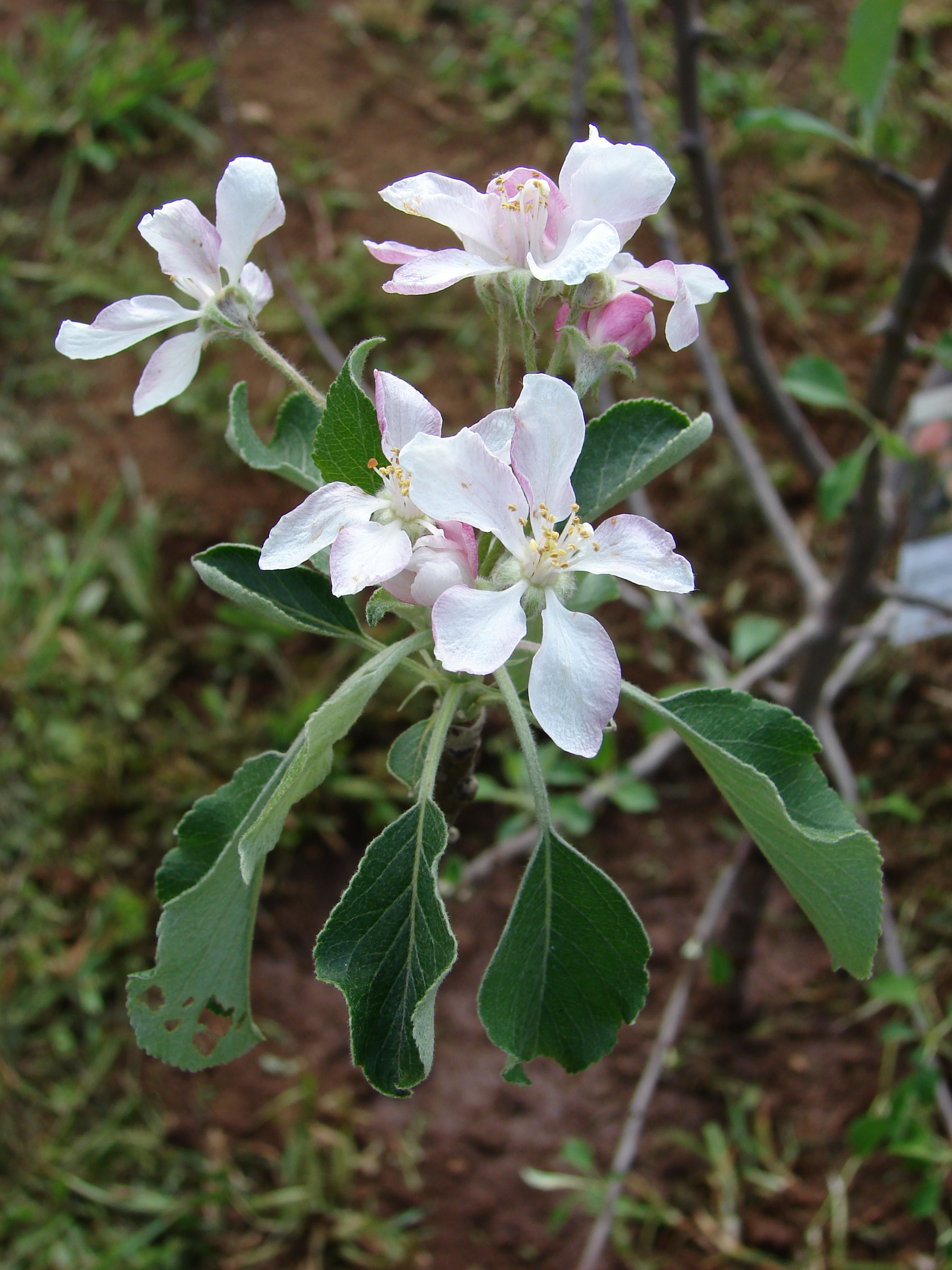
Blossoms and leaves of the 'Dorsett Golden' apple cultivar.

Dorsett Golden is a 'Golden Delicious'-like cultivar of domesticated apple and is descended from it, but is different with that it is early season, and most importantly, it needs a lower amount of cold weather (less than 300 hours) to go into blooming, so it is possible to grow in warm climates.

With those properties, being able to grow in warm climate and early flowering, it is very similar to the Anna apple cultivar which was bred in Israel, and those two are compatible and suitable partners for out-cross pollination. Since like most apple cultivars, they are self-incompatible and need to be fertilized by pollen of a different apple cultivar. So every farmer that grows one of those two cultivars, would most probably need to grow the second one side by side, as well.

"Dorsett" Golden is named after its developer Mrs. Dorsett from Nassau, New Providence Island, Bahamas, who discovered it sometime in the 1950s. "Golden" is remarking its yellow golden colour. However, it sometimes has a pink flush even on large surface, which only enhances its attraction and beauty. It is mainly used for fresh eating having very good texture and sweet flavor. It harvests at early season, and like other early season cultivars, it does not keep fresh too long. Tree has average vigour and is a precocious spur bearer.

Dorsett Golden does best at USDA hardiness zones 5–9. Researchers at University of Florida had observed a Dorset Golden being evergreen, even-though it cannot set fruits properly if it has no dormancy. Usually it goes dormant in December, so then is the best time to do fruit tree pruning.

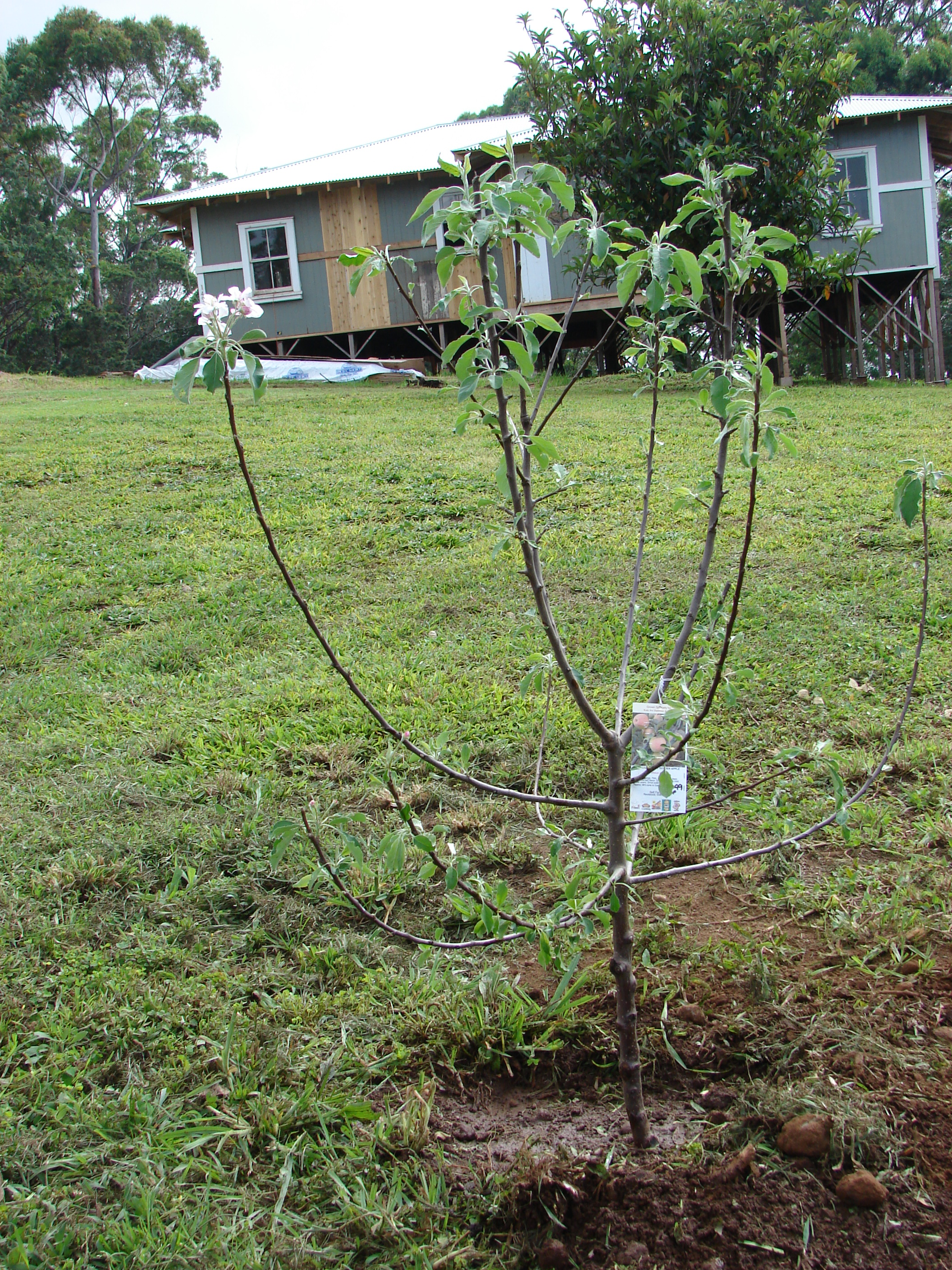
A young planting of Dorsett Golden apple
