= Ana Book Store =

Secondhand bookstore in Singapore

The Ana Book Store is a second-hand bookstore in stall 1, floor 5 of Far East Plaza, 14 Scotts Road, Singapore. The store is owned by a 70-year-old Bengali man named Mohammad Noorul Islam. It is the last second-hand bookstore in Orchard Road. The name, Ana, came from the owner's mother, Sultana.

== History ==
The original store, known as the Modern Book Store, was founded in 1939 by M. Mohammad Aksir, who came from East Pakistan (now Bangladesh) in 1938. He set up the store on Singapore’s Bras Basah Road. In 1978, M. Mohammad Aksir and his father died, leaving Aksir's son, Mohammad Noorul Islam, to run the store. Noorul Islam later changed the bookstore's name to the Ana Book Store. In 1993, when the building housing the original shop was destroyed, the store was moved to Far East Plaza. Customers called Noorul Islam the "Mr Bean of Singapore", something that local newspapers caught on to, providing more publicity for the shop.
