= Anna River =

Anna River may refer to one of the following places in the United States:

- Anna River (Michigan) in the Upper Peninsula of Michigan
- North Anna River in Virginia, tributary of the Pamunkey River
- South Anna River in Virginia, tributary of the Pamunkey River
- Ana River, Oregon
