= Anna, Arkansas =

Coordinates: 35.727305°N 94.286320°W

Anna is an extinct town in Crawford County, in the U.S. state of Arkansas.

A post office was established at Anna in 1880, and remained in operation until 1905.
