= Anna (apple) =

Apple cultivar

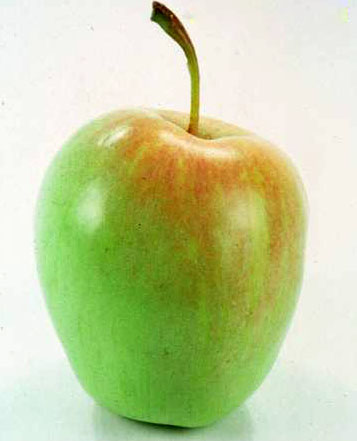
- Species: Malus domestica
- Hybrid parentage: Golden Delicious × Red Hadassiya
- Cultivar: Anna
- Breeder: Abba Stein
- Origin: (Israel) Ein Shemer, 1959

The Anna is a dual-purpose cultivated variety (cultivar) of domesticated apple from Israel that ripens early and does well in warm climates.

== History ==
Anna was bred by Abba Stein at the Ein Shemer kibbutz in Israel, in order to achieve a Golden Delicious-like apple, that can be cultivated in nearly tropical areas. A regular apple needs between 500 – 1000 hours of chilling (aka chill units) in order to get in blossom, but Anna flourishes even with less than 300 hours, so it can be grown in warm climates. It is recommended for USDA hardiness zones 5–9, or rather 6–9.

Anna was introduced in 1959, and has become one of the most popular apple cultivars in Florida.

== Description ==
Anna's skin color is very much like its Golden Delicious parentage, red flushed (by fifty percent) over green or greenish-yellow. It is excellent for fresh eating and keeps shape during cooking. It is self-fertile, but may be cultivated side by side with the Dorsett Golden cultivar or by Ein Shemer, all of which can be grown in warm climates and pollenize each other.

Anna flowers and harvests at a very early season, gives a heavy crop, and keeps fresh 2–3 weeks.

== See also ==
- Agriculture in Israel
- Agricultural research in Israel
