= Anna (band) =

Ukrainian metal band

ANNA
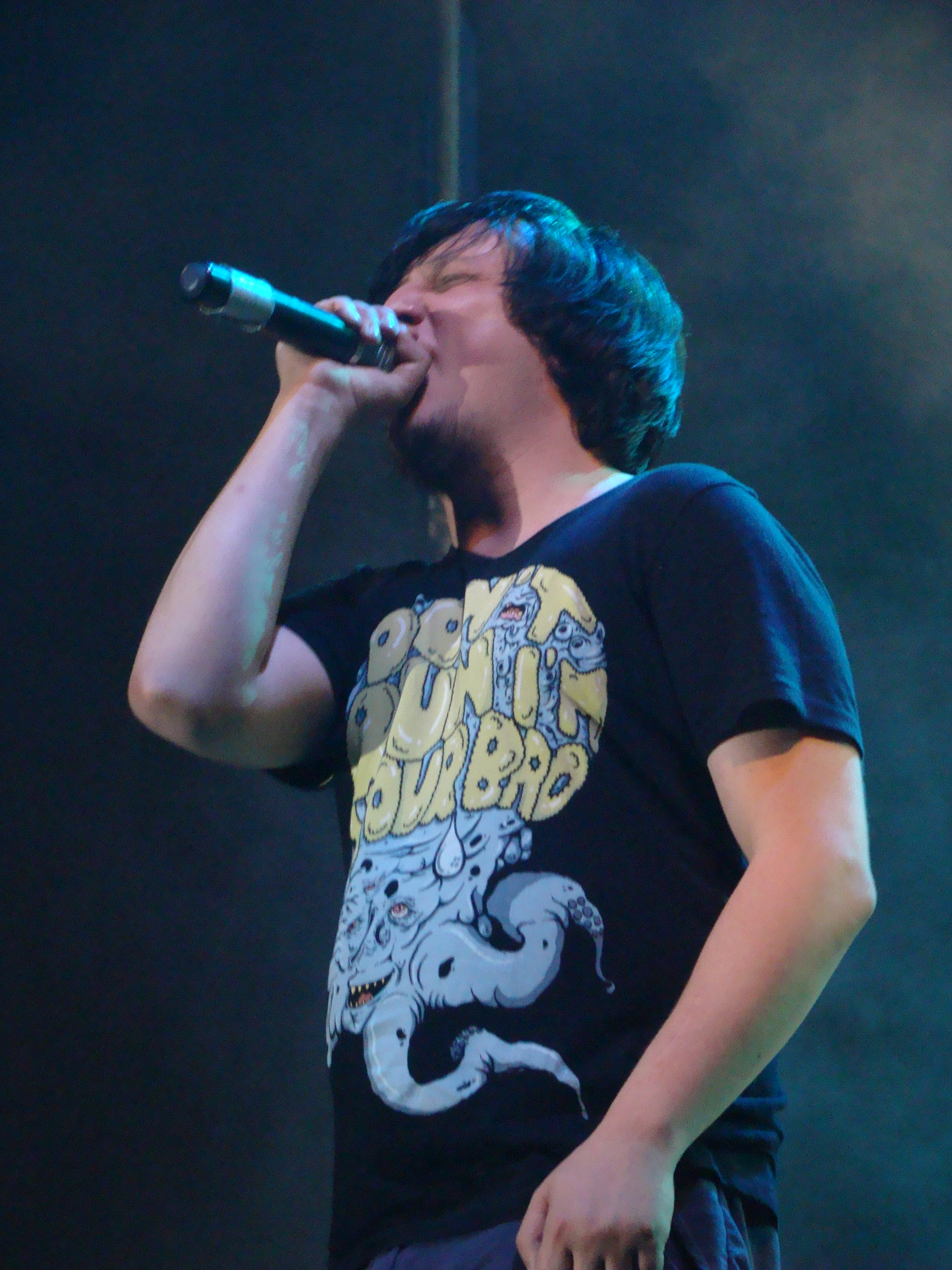
- Viktor Novosiolov in Fort.Missia 2011

Background information
- Origin: Lviv, Ukraine
- Years active: 2002–2013, 2015–present
- Label: Inšamuzyka
- Members: Viktor Novosiolov; Serhii Nesterenko; Yurii Pidtserkovnyi; Mykhaylo Salo; Vadym Baiuk
- Past members: Viktor Zhyrkov
- Website: ANNA

ANNA (Ukrainian: АННА) is a heavy metal band from Lviv, Ukraine.

ANNA has toured three times in Ukraine in support of its two albums and on the band's tenth anniversary. Also, ANNA has taken a part in many Ukrainian festivals (e.g. Ruinatsiia, Rock-Vybukh, Taras Bulba, Metal Heads Mission, Big Alternative Gig, Fort.Missia). The band first became popular in 2008 with the album "Карматреш".

The band ceased to exist in February 2013 because of conflict between Viktor Novosiolov and the rest of the band. Later Novosiolov created a project Kompas while some other ANNA members continue to collaborate as LATUR.

In 2015 the band got active taking part in the festival "Zavantazhennia" and preparing a big solo concert in Kyiv.

== Members ==
- Viktor Novosiolov (Віктор Новосьолов) — vocal
- Serhiy Nesterenko (Сергій Нестеренко) — guitar, vocal
- Yuriy Pidtserkovnyi (Юрій Підцерковний) — guitar
- Mykhailo Salo (Михайло Сало) — bass guitar
- Vadym Baiuk (Вадим Баюк) — drums

Former members

- Viktor Zhyrkov (Віктор Жирков) — programming, samples

== Discography ==
- Проба (Proba, 2003; was not published)
- Сприймай мене (Spryimai mene, 2006; EP)
- Карматреш (Karmatresh, 2008)
- Карматреш (Karmatresh, 2008; single)
- Срібна Змія (Sribna Zmiia, 2010)
- Гімн замурованих (Himn zamurovanykh, 2012; single)
- Ненаситні (Greedy, 2015; Single
- Виродок (Bastard, 2015; Single
- Не згасай (Ne zgasay, 2018; Single)
- Перетинай за гранню грань (2018; EP)

== Videography ==
- "Glamour"
- "Karmatrash"
- "Hra z Bohom"
- "Chornyi Znak"
