= William Holyman =

Australian mariner (1833–1919)

- Born: December 17, 1833; Barton-upon-Humber
- Died: August 18, 1919 (aged 85); Devonport, Tasmania
- Spouse: Mary Ann Sayer (m. 1855; died 1900)
- Children: 4, including William Holyman Jr.
- Family: Holyman family

William Holyman (1833–1919) was a mariner and shipping magnate from England who founded William Holyman & Sons and the White Star Line. He is the founder of the Holyman family.

== Early life ==
William Holyman was born on 17 December 1833 in Barton-upon-Humber, England. He trained to be a mariner at Trinity House School in Hull. William's father was also a mariner who was lost at sea in 1839. In 1847, Holyman became an apprentice seaman. He joined the crew of the Elizabeth Ratcliffe in 1854, which was en route to Australia.

== Life in Australia ==
The Elizabeth Ratcliffe arrived in Launceston, Tasmania on 12 June 1854. He joined the crew of the Amelia Francis, captained by William Chapman, in 1855. He married Mary Ann Sayer of Devonport, Tasmania on December 15, 1855. They had four children, Thomas Henry Holyman, William Holyman Jr., James Holyman, and Susannah Wood. All three of their sons followed in William's footsteps as mariners and shipmasters.

Mary Ann's father James Sayer owned several barges, and William Holyman worked on them throughout the 1850s before founding the shipping company William Holyman & Sons. Holyman commanded the Cousins from 1861 onwards, turning a profit as a trader. In 1871, he bought the steamship Annie but sold it two years later after failing to turn a profit. The shipping company grew after Holyman's sons became shipmasters and bought additional ships for the company's fleet.

In 1882, Holyman's fleet was registered as the White Star Line. Holyman retired from sailing in 1886 and focused on managing the company and being involved in the local Devonport community. He founded a local library and chamber of commerce, eventually serving as chairman of the town board. The family also owned 27,000 acres of estates in the Bass Strait islands. After Mary Ann's death in 1900, Holyman's son William Holyman Jr. began managing the company. It grew to include shipyards and an automobile mail service. In 1902, the company established a continuous interstate shipping service to Melbourne.

Holyman was a Freemason, an Odd Fellows member, and a member of the Protestant Alliance Friendly Society. He died on 18 August 1919 in East Devonport.

== Legacy ==
Holyman's descendants were notable figures in the Tasmanian shipping and transportation industry. They include Victor Clive Holyman and Ivan Nello Holyman, who founded what became Australian National Airways.
