= Holyman House =

Art Deco building in Launceston, Tasmania, Australia

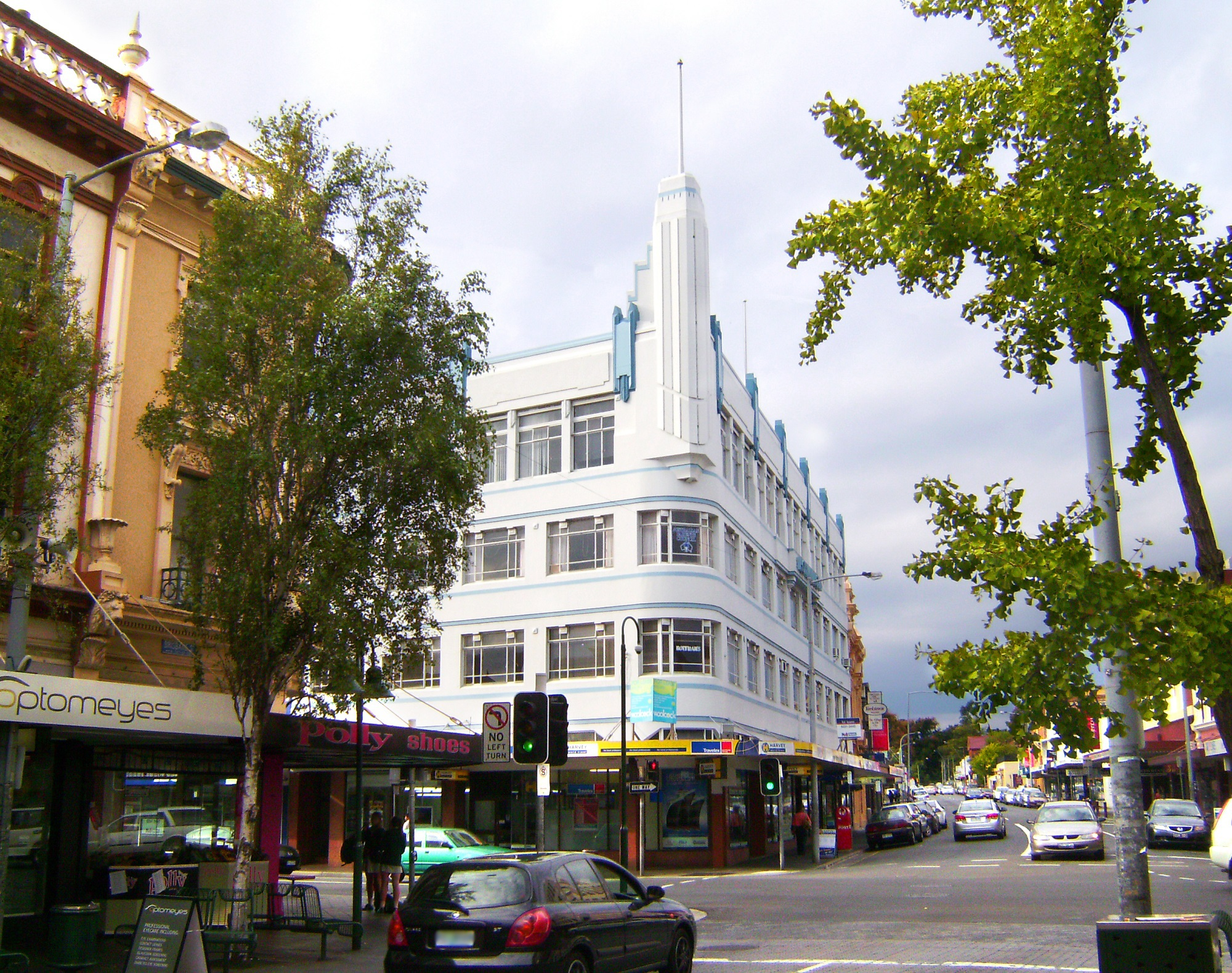
- Holyman House from "The Avenue" on Brisbane Street

General information
- Type: Commercial offices
- Location: Launceston, Tasmania, 52-60 Brisbane Street
- Coordinates: 41.4360°S 147.1406°E
- Completed: 1936
- Owner: historic: ANA present: various businesses

Height
- Antenna spire: 26 metres (85 ft)
- Roof: 19.7 metres (65 ft)

Technical details
- Floor count: 5
- Lifts/elevators: 1

Design and construction
- Architects: H S East and Roy Smith
- Main contractor: J & T Gunn

Holyman House is an Art Deco building in the central business district of Launceston, Tasmania, Australia.

The building was designed by H. S. East and Roy Sharrington Smith architects, of Launceston, with Clive Steele, of Melbourne, as consulting engineer.

The building was built in 1936 to house the various branches of the Holyman family's shipping and aviation interests as well as an automobile showroom for Holyman's automotive division.

The building was designed to reflect the bold futuristic vision of the Holyman Company with the sleek curves, neon-lit spire and modern steel frame construction. It was the headquarters of Australian National Airways, an evolution of Holyman's Airways.

After the fall of the Holyman's empire in the 1950s, it was sold to Ansett Australia and eventually divided into office spaces. Holyman House now houses a travel centre on the ground level corner allotment where the flight lounge used to be.

The building is on the Tasmanian Heritage Register.

There is also a heritage listed building in Flinders Street, Melbourne, Victoria with the same name.

== Records ==
University of Tasmania special collections holds records of the operations of the Holyman businesses related to the building.

== Plans ==
The Tasmanian Archive and Heritage Office in Hobart hold plans made for the construction of the building.

== Gallery ==
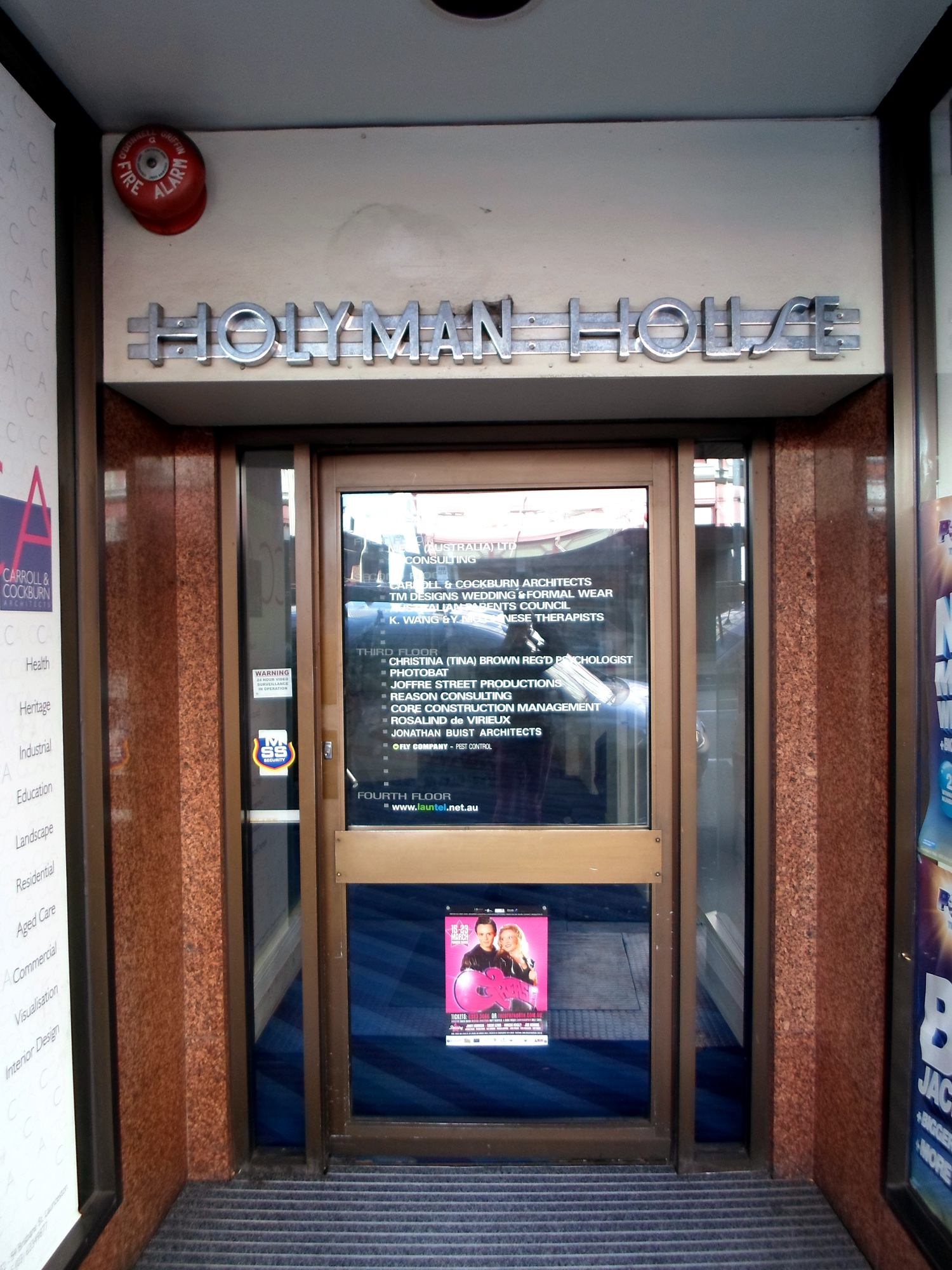
Main entrance into with original red granite and chrome lettering. Door itself replaced in the late 1900s.

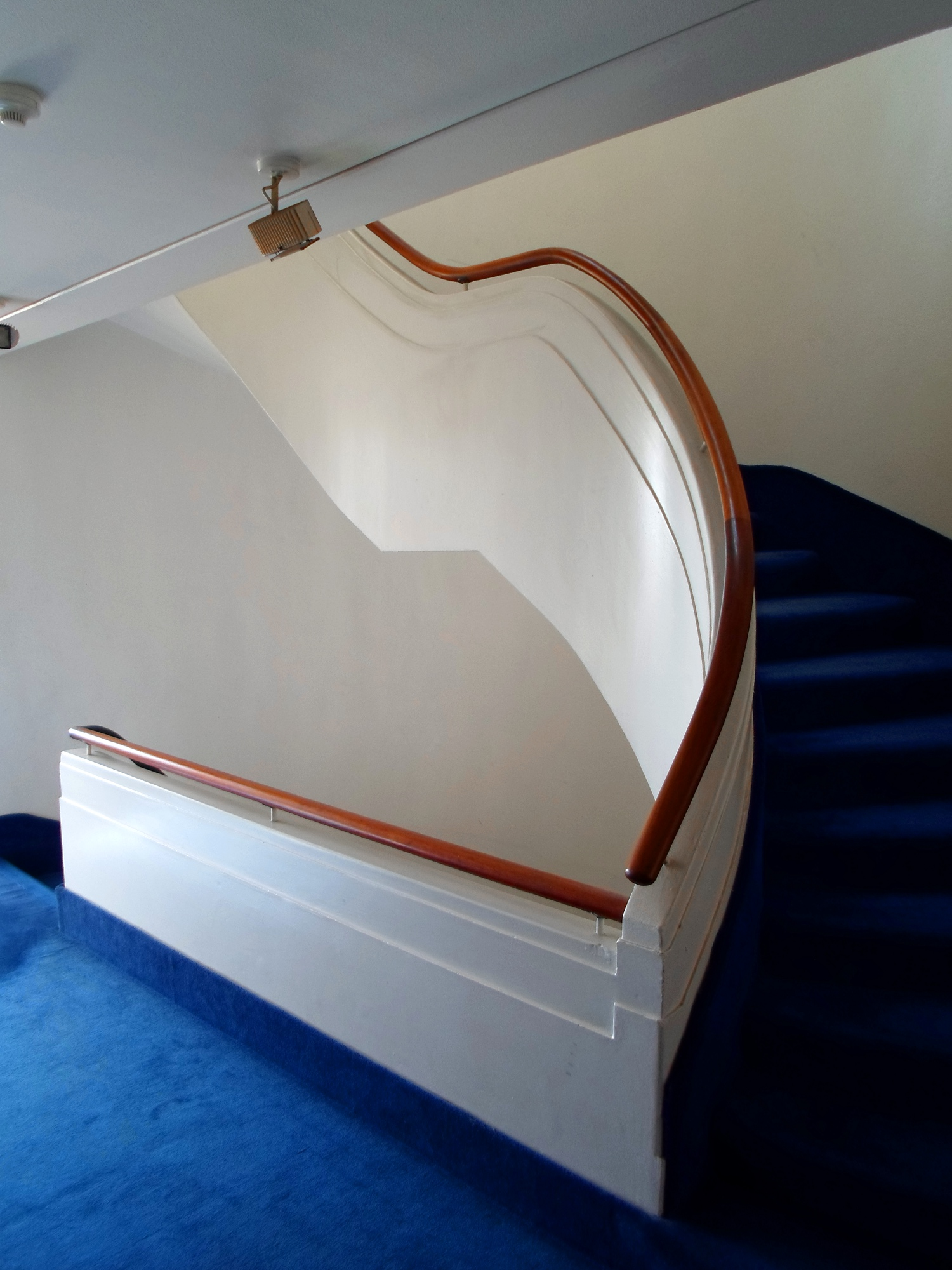
Main stairwell on level 2 showing the streamlined Art Deco design
