= Anna (1912 automobile) =

Defunct American motor vehicle manufacturer

Overview
- Production: 1912

Body and chassis
- Body style: 2-door Coupe

Powertrain
- Engine: 2.8L L-head 2-cylinder
- Power output: 22 hp (16.4 kW)

Dimensions
- Wheelbase: 100 inches

The Anna was a short-lived American car model, manufactured by the Anna Motor Car Company in Anna, Illinois, in 1912. It was fitted with what was called a "Democrat" body on an 100 in (2,500 mm) wheelbase. It was equipped with a naturally-aspirated 2.8L water-cooled L-Head 2- cylinder engine and used a roller chain to transmit its power to the wheels. It is claimed that it had 22 HP (16.4 kW), but the torque is still unknown.
