= Anna, Russia =

Anna (Russian: Анна) is the name of several inhabited localities in Russia.

Urban localities

- Anna, Voronezh Oblast, an urban-type settlement under the administrative jurisdiction of Anninskoye Urban Settlement in Anninsky District of Voronezh Oblast

Rural localities

- Anna, Primorsky Krai, a selo under the administrative jurisdiction of Nakhodka City Under Krai Jurisdiction in Primorsky Krai
