= Victor Holyman =

Australian aviator (1894–1934)

Victor Clive Holyman
- Born: 27 August 1894; Devonport, Tasmania, Australia
- Died: 19 October 1934 (aged 40); Bass Strait, Australia
- Cause of death: Aviation accident
- Spouse: Hazel Gaunt (m. 1921)
- Father: William Holyman Jr.
- Relatives: Ivan Nello Holyman (brother)
- Family: Holyman family

Victor Clive Holyman (27 August 1894 – 19 October 1934) was an Australian aviator and founder of Holyman's Airways Ltd, the precursor to Australian National Airways.

== Early life ==
Victor Clive Holyman was born on 27 August 1894 in Devonport, Tasmania. He was one of 13 children born to William Holyman Jr. and Honora Holyman. Victor's father was a mariner, and his grandfather William Holyman Sr. was the founder of William Holyman & Sons shipping company.

He attended Launceston Church Grammar School before apprenticing as a sailor at 16. He sailed on the Barque CJS, which traded goods between Australia and Mauritius.

== First World War ==
Around the beginning of the First World War, Holyman sailed to Lemnos as a first mate on the British SS Aragaz. He enlisted in the Royal Naval Air Service in June 1916, serving in France as a Temporary Flight Sub Lieutenant before being promoted to Flight Lieutenant. In 1917, he was transferred to RAF Martlesham Heath in the United Kingdom where he was a test pilot. In 1918, Holyman returned to Australia where he was transferred to the Royal Air Force, formed from the RNAS and the Royal Flying Corps. He was second to the Royal Australian Navy as an Acting Flight Lieutenant of the RAF, before retiring in 1920.

== Shipping and aviation ==
After the war ended, Holyman returned to Holyman & Sons where he had command of several ships, including the SS Hall Caine, Koomeela, Koringa, Wariatea and Laranah. On 22 August 1921, he married Hazel Gaunt. He helped establish Launceston Airport and the Tasmanian division of the Australian Aero Club with C. W. B. Martin in 1927.

In 1932, he convinced his family to enter the aviation business. He founded the airline Holyman Bros Pty Ltd. with his younger brother Ivan Nello Holyman. They purchased the airline's first plane, a De Havilland Fox Moth named Miss Currie, which was piloted by Victor. His wife Hazel was the company's first hostess, and Jack Stubbs was its engineer. Hazel drove passengers to the airport, providing them with biscuits, blankets, and thermoses of coffee and tea before the flight. The airline's route travelled between Launceston, Tasmania and Flinders Island. They purchased a De Havilland DH.84 Dragon in 1933, and started a route between Launceston and Melbourne. Miss Currie was later destroyed in a fire at Broken Hill.

The company absorbed several competitors and was renamed Holyman’s Airways Pty Ltd before being awarded a tender as a subsidised air mail service to Tasmania in 1934 as part of the Empire Air Mail Scheme. They subsequently purchased two new De Havilland DH86 aircraft, the first of which was named the Miss Hobart. The Miss Hobart was the first of its kind to arrive in Australia. It commenced regular service between Launceston and Melbourne on 3 October 1934, co-piloted by Holyman.

Holyman was known for being a skilled but risky aviator. One observer commented that "Whenever Victor takes off, I keep my fingers crossed, and watch to see whether the fuselage falls off, being grossly overloaded."

== 1934 Holyman's De Havilland DH86 crash ==
On 19 October 1934, Holyman disappeared when the Miss Hobart De Havilland DH86 crashed over the Bass Strait. Holyman was Chief Pilot and radio operator onboard the flight, which departed from Launceston Airport at 9 am, bound for Melbourne. Also onboard were co-pilot Gilbert Jenkins and nine passengers. The plane made regular radio reports; its last transmission was received at 10:20 am when it was flying over Rodondo Island, just south of Wilsons Promontory.

Small amounts of wreckage and leaked oil were found at the site of the crash on 20 October. The passengers and crew were not located and were presumed dead, including Holyman.

== Aftermath ==
After Victor Holyman's death, his brother Ivan was put in charge of Holyman's Airways. The company's reputation suffered after the crash and it had fewer passengers than normal in the following year, although it eventually recovered. In 1936, it merged with Adelaide Airways, becoming Australian National Airways. Victor's widow Hazel was distraught after the accident, and left the company to travel in England and the United States. She returned to Australian National Airways in 1939 at Ivan's behest, to serve as Superintendent of Air Hostesses. She was nicknamed "Matron" Holyman, and helped develop the air hostess profession in Australia.
