= Josef Holyman =

Australian cricketer (born 1970)

Personal information
- Full name: Josef Michael Holyman
- Born: 10 June 1970 (age 56); Launceston, Tasmania, Australia
- Batting: Right-handed
- Role: Wicket-keeper

Domestic team information
- Years: Team
- 1990/91–1991/92: Tasmania

Career statistics
| Competition | First-class | List A |
|---|---|---|
| Matches | 9 | 3 |
| Runs scored | 141 | 7 |
| Batting average | 11.75 | 2.33 |
| 100s/50s | 0/0 | 0/0 |
| Top score | 38 | 5 |
| Catches/stumpings | 25/1 | 1/0 |
- Source: CricketArchive, 30 August 2010

Josef Michael Holyman (born 10 June 1970) was an Australian cricketer who played for Tasmania in the early 1990s. He was born at Launceston, Tasmania in 1970.
