= Agency for New Americans =

US-based non-profit organization

The Agency for New Americans (ANA) is the arm of the Episcopal Migration Ministries (EMM) in Boise, Idaho, which serves the primary and secondary enculturation needs of refugees. It is part of Jannus, Inc., formerly the Mountain States Group (a community-based, private non-profit corporation with 501(c)(3) status), and has operated under contract with, and under the aegis of, the VOLAG EMM in Boise since its establishment in October 1996.

ANA provides direct resettlement services to Boise area refugees, including case management, employment development and placement, support services (including "cultural ambassadors," interpretation, translation and English tutoring) and other leveraged community integration services in order to enable refugees to establish their own economic self-sufficiency and social integration.

ANA's current clientele hails largely from Iraq, Afghanistan, Congo, Myanmar, Bhutan, Somalia, and Uzbekistan.
