= Ivan Nello Holyman =

Australian aviation executive (1896–1957)

Ivan Holyman KBE
- Born: Ivan Nello Holyman; 9 July 1896; Devonport, Tasmania, Australia
- Died: 18 January 1956 (aged 59); Honolulu, Hawaii, United States
- Spouse: Enid Coleville McKinlay (married 1924)
- Children: 3
- Father: William Holyman Jr.
- Relatives: Victor Clive Holyman (brother)
- Family: Holyman family

Ivan Nello Holyman KBE (1896–1957) was an Australian aviation executive who founded Australian National Airways.

== Early life ==
Ivan Nello Holyman was born in Devonport, Tasmania on 9 July 1896. He was the eleventh out of thirteen children born to William Holyman Jr. and Honora. Ivan's grandfather William Holyman founded a shipping company called William Holyman & Sons Pty Ltd in Launceston, Tasmania. Ivan attended Launceston Church Grammar School before becoming a clerk at William Holyman & Sons in 1911.

== World War I ==
On 18 August 1914, Holyman joined the First Australian Imperial Force. He served in the 12th Battalion at Gallipoli and the Western Front, fighting with distinction at Jeancourt, France in 1918. He was wounded three times before his service ended on 9 July 1919. He was awarded the Military Cross for his service.

== Career ==
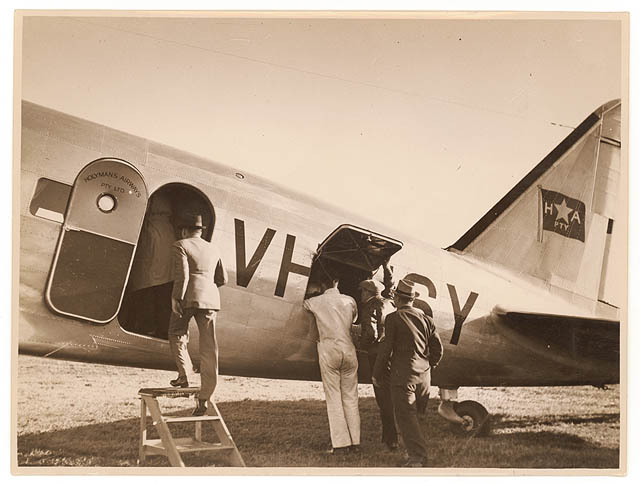
The Bungana, part of Holyman's Airways fleet in 1936.

After the war, Holyman returned to his family's shipping company and took over after his father died in 1921. He married Enid Coleville McKinlay on 2 April 1924. They had a daughter and two sons. In 1932, he and his brother Victor founded an airline, Holyman Bros Pty Ltd. Victor flew passengers between Launceston and Flinders Island on a De Havilland Fox Moth. The company expanded by absorbing competitors and delivering mail to the mainland in 1934. That year, Victor died in an aviation accident over the Bass Strait and Ivan was left in charge of the company.

In 1936, the airline went national and was registered as Australian National Airways. Holyman introduced several new services to Australian air travel, notably flight attendants, in-flight meals, and passenger insurance. The airline became one of the major airlines in Australia, and Holyman's influence is credited with helping to lift the ban on the importation of American commercial aircraft. After the ban was lifted, the airline was able to acquire American planes like the Douglas DC-2.

Holyman was appointed a Knight Commander of the Order of the British Empire in 1956. He died in Honolulu on 18 January 1957, while on holiday with his family. In 2025, Holyman was inducted into the Australian Aviation Hall of Fame.
