= William Holyman Jr. =

Australian businessman (1858–1921)

- Born: July 23, 1858; Torquay, Victoria
- Died: September 29, 1921 (aged 63); Launceston, Tasmania
- Spouse: Honora Ballard (m. 1878)
- Children: 13, including Ivan Nello Holyman and Victor Holyman
- Father: William Holyman

William Holyman Jr. (1858–1921) was an Australian shipping magnate and owner of the shipping company William Holyman & Sons.

== Early life and education ==
William Holyman Jr. was born in Torquay, Victoria on 23 July 1858. His father William Holyman was a mariner from Barton-upon-Humber, England who established the William Holyman & Sons shipping company in Devonport, Tasmania. William Jr. had three siblings: Thomas Henry, James, and Susannah. The Holyman children all attended a small school run by a former ship's captain.

== Career ==
Holyman began working for his father's shipping business in 1871, when he was thirteen years old. He became captain of the Colleen Bawn in 1877. He married Honora Ballard on 1 January 1878, and their honeymoon took place on his first voyage aboard the Colleen Bawn.

After his father's retirement from the sea in 1886, Holyman became owner of Holyman & Sons in 1887. He relocated the company's headquarters from Devonport to Launceston, Tasmania in 1899. Holyman & Sons competed fiercely with Huddart Parker and Union Steam Ship Company, and soon began buying steamships to replace its sailing fleet during this period.

In 1901, Holyman was left in complete control of the company after his father retired fully. Holyman spent his remaining years in Launceston. On 29 September 1921, Holyman died from coronary vascular disease. He and his wife Honora had six sons, including Ivan Nello Holyman and Victor Holyman, and seven daughters. His daughter Love was excluded from his will because she had converted to Catholicism. After William Holyman Jr.'s death, his brother James took over the company.
