= Annah Robinson Watson =

American author

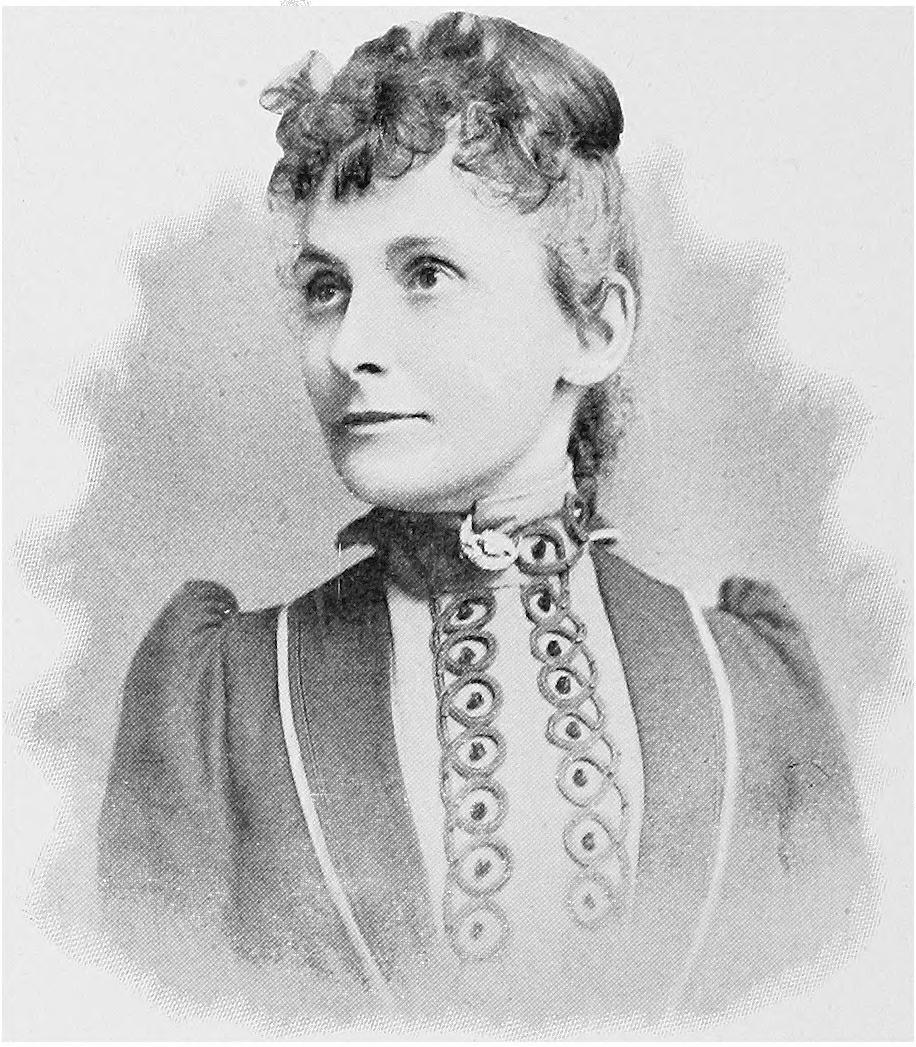
- Born: Annah Walker Robinson; 1848
- Died: 1930 (aged 81–82)
- Occupations: Writer, poet
- Spouse: James H. Watson
- Children: Archibald Robinson Watson James Henry Watson Elizabeth Lee Watson
- Writing career
- Notable works: Some Notable Families of America; Of Sceptred Race; Passion Flowers

Annah Robinson Watson (1848–1930) was an American author, the founding member and president of the Nineteenth Century Club, and a collector of American folklore.

== Early life ==
Watson was born Annah Walker Robinson on the Taylor homestead, "Springfields", near Louisville, Kentucky, to Mary Louise Taylor Robinson and Archibald Magill Robinson., she was the granddaughter of Hancock Taylor, a brother of President Zachariah Taylor. Watson was described as a "romantic, poetic, imaginative child". After some years in the countryside, her family moved to Louisville, and Watson received an education there and later in Chicago.

== Written works ==
After completing her studies, she entered society as a poet. She continued to write, publishing "Baby's Mission", which received widespread popularity and was published in the London journal Chatterbox. She also won a contest in the New York Churchman for best lullaby. In addition to publishing many poems and prose works under her own name, she also extensively published unsigned work, including reviews and editorials.

In 1870 Watson married James H. Watson, the son of Mississippi judge John William Clark Watson. She later settled with her family in Memphis, Tennessee, where her husband practiced law. She published tales and superstitions collected from African-American peoples, apparently in the dialect of the teller, and speculated on a type of ethnographic racialism. Her works include Some Notable Families of America, Of Sceptred Race, Passion Flowers and a paper—"Comparative Afro-American Folk-Lore"—read at the International Folk-Lore Congress of the World's Columbian Exposition of 1893.

In Memphis, Watson was a founding member and third president of the Nineteenth Century Club, the largest woman's club in the South. At the time, clubs were viewed as schools where women were able to extend their intellectual endeavors. The club was tied to the Women's suffrage movement, though the members made it clear that theirs was a very feminine brand of activism, often justified with explanations of how it helped women to become better in family life. Although Watson cautioned against pursuing activism at the expense of the family, she noted "a new sense of power and capacity among American women", and published The New Woman of the New South & the Attitude of Southern Women on the Suffrage Question with suffragist Josephine Henry in 1895.

In 1913, General James Grant Wilson submitted Watson's poem titled "The Siege of Vicksburg, a Battle of the Bluffs" on her behalf for the 43rd reunion of the Society of the Army of the Tennessee.

In 1914, Watson published Golden Deeds on the Field of Honor: Stories of Young American Heroes, which focuses on the Civil War, primarily from the Southern perspective.
