= Anna, Kohgiluyeh and Boyer-Ahmad =

Anna عنا
- Village
- Location within Iran
- Coordinates: 30°24′51″N 51°14′22″E
- Country: Iran
- Province: Kohgiluyeh and Boyer-Ahmad
- County: Basht
- Bakhsh: Basht
- Rural District: Babuyi

Population (2006)
  - Total: 25
- Time zone: UTC+3:30 (IRST)
  - Summer (DST): UTC+4:30 (IRDT)

Anna (Persian: عنا, also Romanized as ‘Annā, ‘Anā’, and Anā) is a village in Babuyi Rural District, Basht District, Basht County, Kohgiluyeh and Boyer-Ahmad Province, Iran. At the 2006 census, its population was 25, in 10 families.
