= Australian National Airways =

Australian airline company

- Founded: 1936
- Commenced operations: 1936
- Ceased operations: 1957
- Key people: Victor Holyman and Ivan Holyman

Australian National Airways (ANA) was the predominant aerial carrier for Australia from the mid-1930s to the early 1950s.

== History ==
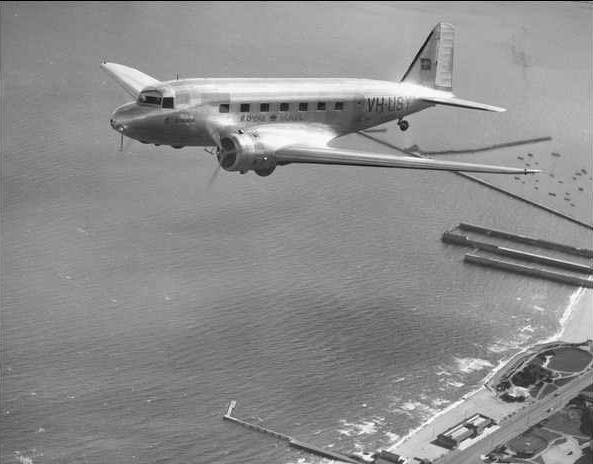
Douglas DC-2 in 1936

On 19 March 1932 Flinders Island Airways began a regular aerial service using the Desoutter Mk.II VH-UEE Miss Flinders between Launceston, Tasmania and Flinders Island in Bass Strait, which competed with shipping services offered by William Holyman & Sons. Due to monopoly arrangements with other Australian shipowners, Holymans (as it was known) was only allowed to carry passengers on internal Tasmanian routes, and resented the intrusion. Brothers Captain Victor Holyman and Ivan Holyman purchased a de Havilland D.H.83 Fox Moth VH-UQM Miss Currie which entered service on the same route on 1 October 1932, and soon amalgamated with Flinders Island Airways to form Tasmanian Aerial Services Pty Ltd. They later purchased a de Havilland D.H.84 Dragon VH-URD Miss Launceston that began a regular service between Melbourne, Flinders Island and Launceston in September 1933.

Following the Government of Australia's announcement of the Empire Air Mail Scheme late in 1933, Holymans entered into a partnership with the two main shipping companies servicing Tasmania, Huddart Parker and the Union Steamship Company of New Zealand, to form an equal-share partnership in a new Holyman's Airways Pty Ltd headed by Ivan Holyman. The new company, with a capital of £90,000, was registered in July 1934, and ordered two de Havilland D.H.86 Express airliners. The first of these, VH-URN Miss Hobart, began operating across Bass Strait on 28 September 1934, but went missing just three weeks later, on 18 October, and was believed to have crashed off Wilsons Promontory. Captain Victor Holyman's was one of the eleven lives lost.

Undaunted, Holyman's Airways purchased a second-hand D.H.84 (VH-URG Golden West) and ordered two more D.H.86s, and soon began to expand operations throughout south-eastern Australia. A route from Melbourne to Sydney via Canberra was established in 1935 using D.H.86 VH-UUB Loila. On the day of a first proving flight between the capitals, 2 October, another D.H.86, VH-URT Loina, crashed into Bass Strait off Flinders Island killing all five on board. The Melbourne to Sydney flights, the first regular daily airmail service between the two centres, commenced on 7 October.

After a non-fatal accident in Bass Strait to the D.H.86 VH-USW Lepena on 13 December 1935, Ivan Holyman used his influence with the Australian Government to have an official ban on the importation of United States built commercial aircraft to be lifted, and Holyman's Airways ordered an example of the recently introduced Douglas DC-2. It entered service as VH-USY Bungana on 18 May 1936.

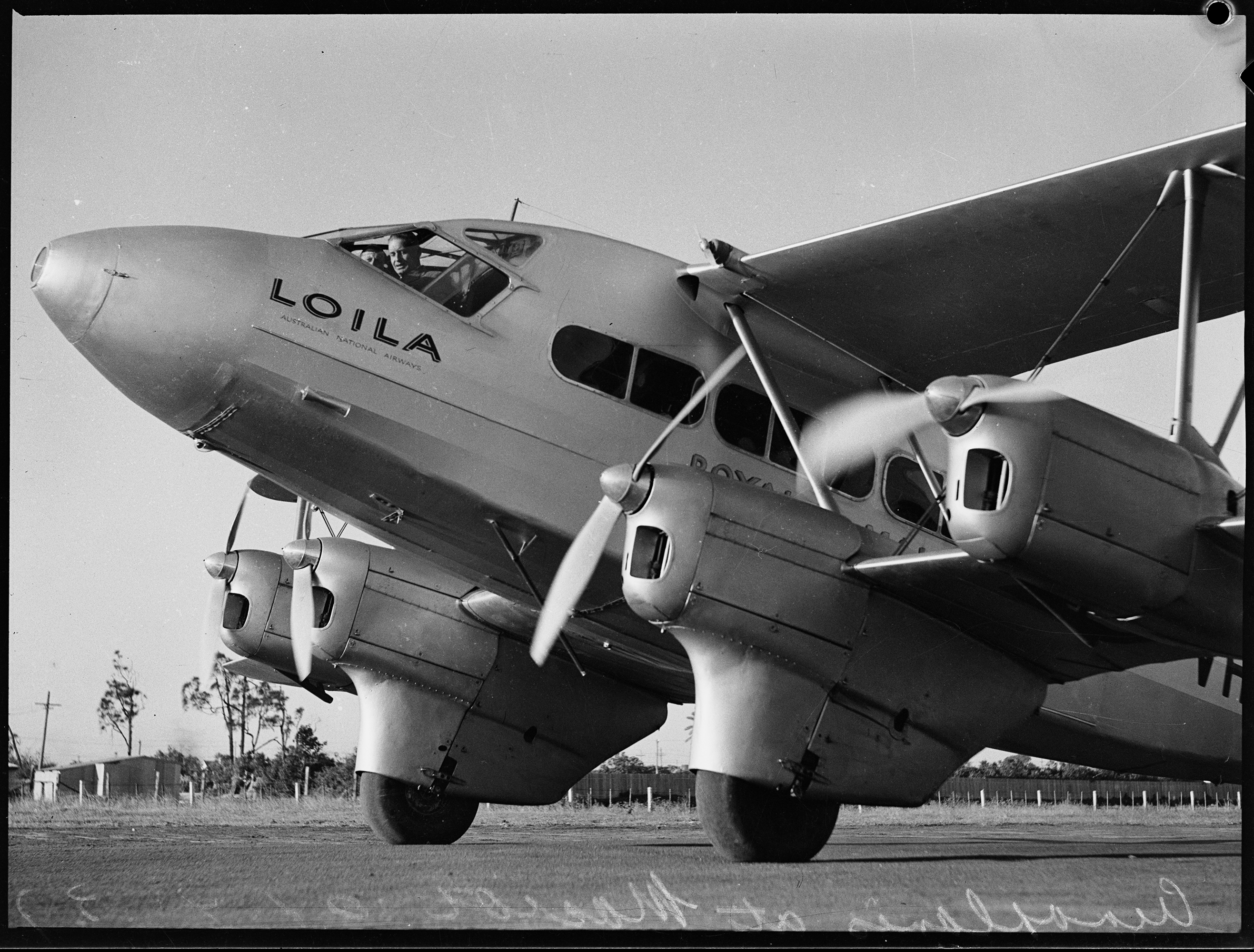
Loila, 'Australian National Airways' de Havilland aeroplane, Mascot, Sydney, 1937

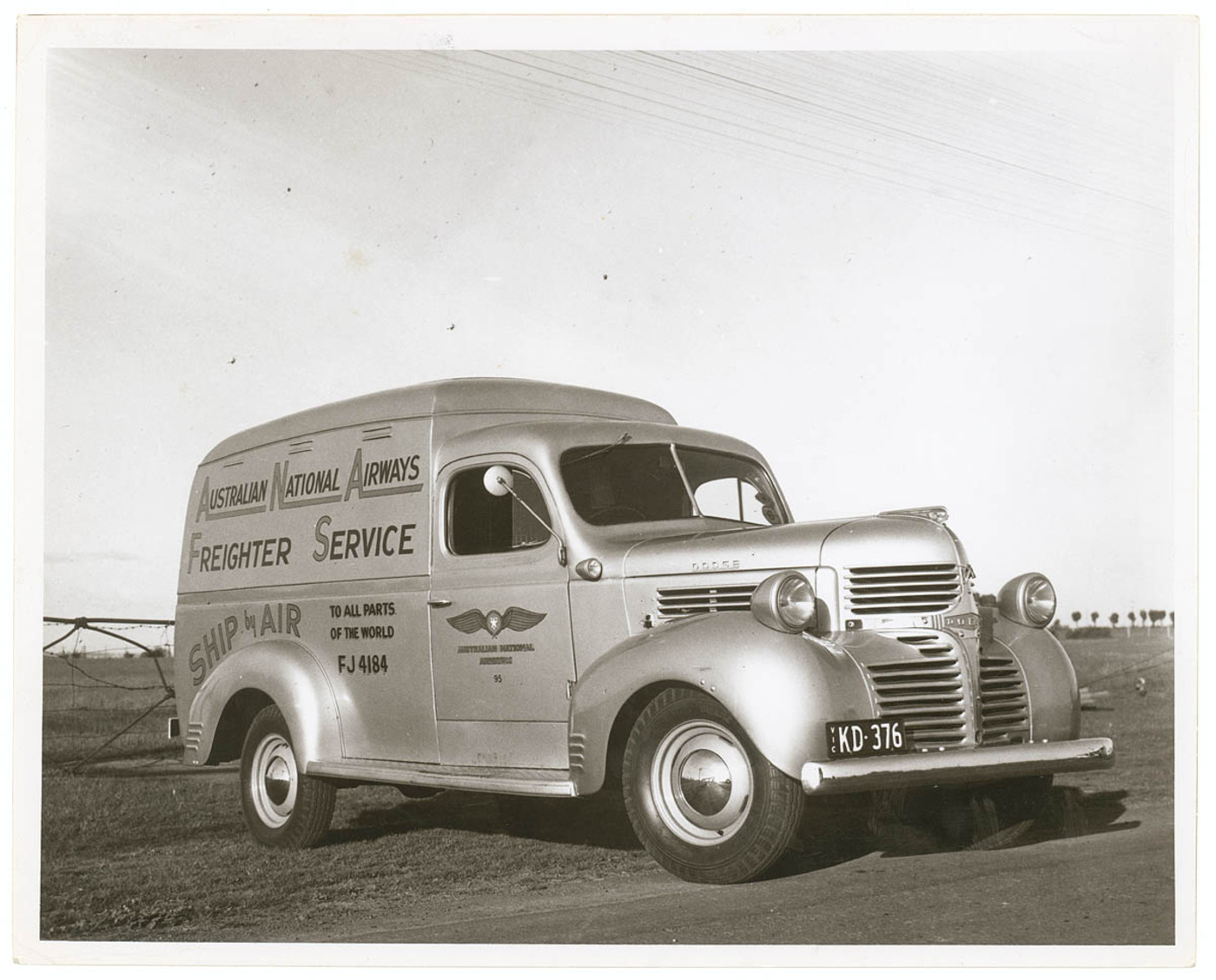
Australian National Airways Freighter Service van, 1946

Early in 1936 Ivan Holyman approached the Adelaide Steamship Company, owners of Adelaide Airways, with a view to an amalgamation aiming to become Australia's most powerful airline. Adelaide Airways had recently taken over West Australian Airways and the new combine would thus effectively control airline traffic between Perth, Adelaide, Melbourne and Sydney. With funding from the Orient Steam Navigation Company a new Australian National Airways was registered on 13 May 1936, and began services under its new name on 1 July 1936. It acquired a second DC-2 VH-UXJ Loongana that began a twice-weekly service between Melbourne and Perth on 21 December 1936.

Meanwhile, efforts to expand operation northwards to Queensland were being thwarted by Airlines of Australia (AoA), its main competitor. Established in 1931 as New England Airways by G.A. Robinson and Keith Virtue of Lismore, it operated services in northern New South Wales and between Sydney and Brisbane, expanding further into Queensland by taking over a number of struggling regional airlines during the mid-1930s. It was restructured as AoA in 1934 with funding by an investment group the British Pacific Trust. In 1936 it introduced Stinson Model A airliners in a regular service between Sydney and Brisbane, and later acquired Douglas DC-2s and Douglas DC-3s. After several months of fruitless negotiations with its financiers, ANA managed to gain a controlling interest in AoA in April 1937, although the two airlines retained separate public identities until 1942. Between them the two airlines operated four DC-2s and four DC-3s by the time of the outbreak of World War II, as well as several other aircraft including two Model As, two D.H.84s, two D.H.86s and nine de Havilland D.H.89 Rapidess

After Australia entered World War II in 1939, the Government of Australia requisitioned ANA's four DC-3s, leaving it to battle on with its assortment of lesser aircraft. However, ANA was soon operating a network of services around Australia on behalf of the war effort. It operated a large number of Douglas DC-2s, DC-3s and even at least one rare Douglas DC-5, mostly on the behalf of the American forces in Australia.

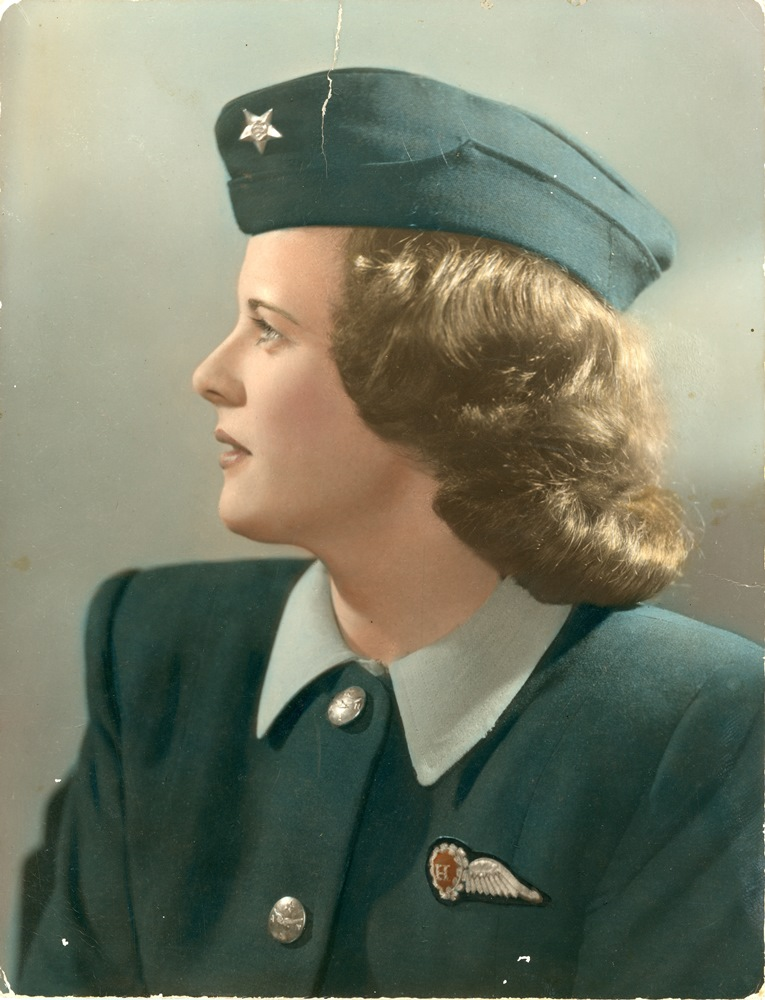
Clare McHugh Douglas, upon completion of her training as an air hostess for ANA, c. 1947

With the end of World War II, the Chifley government proposed a Commonwealth Government monopoly on scheduled airline services throughout Australia. Its legislation was stymied, however, by the Airline Operators Secretariat, which argued that the Constitution guaranteed freedom of commerce between states. The High Court agreed in its Airlines Case decision. That did not, however, prevent the government from starting its own airline, Trans Australia Airlines (TAA), in 1946. ANA then had effective and well-resourced competition on its inter-state air services for the first time since 1937.

In 1946, the main aircraft flown by both ANA and TAA on interstate services were DC-3s, but both airlines soon acquired small numbers of Douglas DC-4s for long-distance and high-capacity services. ANA's attempts to further improve its fleet were hamstrung by such factors as insufficient finance and, when finance was available, Government refusal to allow large foreign currency purchases to the detriment of the national balance of trade. In the late 1940s, TAA began acquiring Convair 240s, which were a pressurised improvement over the DC-3. ANA was not then in a financial position to begin replacing its DC-3s with more modern aircraft. When finally able to purchase new aircraft for long-range services, ANA chose the pressurised Douglas DC-6B whereas TAA acquired the Vickers Viscount. Although the DC-6B was a more economical aircraft to operate than the smaller Viscount, passengers preferred the Viscount, which was faster and, being a turboprop aircraft, had a quieter cabin with less vibration.

Ivan Holyman also wanted to expand ANA's activities to cover international routes, but that was largely prevented by the Commonwealth Government holding an effective monopoly on Australian-based international air travel through its own airline, Qantas. An exception was the part Australian-government owned British Commonwealth Pacific Airlines, whose flights were operated by ANA between 1946 and 1948, when the airline purchased its own aircraft. ANA aircraft occasionally flew overseas under contract to the Commonwealth Government, such as immigrant flights between Australia and Italy in the late 1940s. ANA also commenced regular flights to North America in 1947 using DC4s, the main stops being in Fiji, Honolulu, San Francisco and Vancouver, not including refueling stops over the Pacific. ANA also had overseas commercial aviation interests through shareholdings in Cathay Pacific and Air Ceylon.

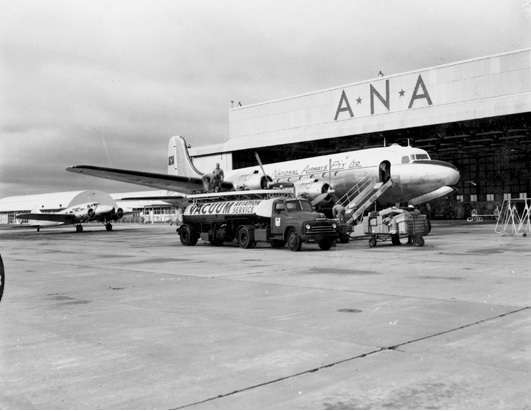
ANA Douglas DC-4 aircraft at Perth Airport in 1955

TAA proved so successful that, after the Liberal–County Party Coalition defeated the Chifley government at the 1949 federal election, the new government was reluctant to close it down as the directors of ANA expected. Recognising the benefits of competition in commercial aviation, the government enacted the Two Airline Agreement in 1952, to ensure that both airlines maintained viable business, while preventing competition from third parties, such as Ansett Airlines, from operating on inter-capital air services.

In 1957, Ivan Holyman died in his sleep while holidaying in Honolulu, the shareholders offered to sell out to the government, in order that ANA might merge with TAA and some smaller airlines. The government declined the offer.

After initially dismissing his offer, the ANA board began talking with Reg Ansett, head of the much smaller Ansett Transport Industries; with its main interstate operation Ansett Airways. ANA was sold to Ansett, on 3 October 1957, for £3.3 million. The two airlines were merged to form Ansett-ANA on 21 October 1957 and the name was retained until 1 November 1968 when it was renamed Ansett Airlines of Australia.

== Accidents and incidents ==
During the 1940s ANA was plagued by a series of accidents and disasters that resulted in considerable adverse publicity. The most serious of these were:

- 25 October 1938, DC-2 VH-UYC Kyeema overflew Essendon Airport and crashed into Mount Dandenong. All four crew and fourteen passengers were killed.
- 8 February 1940, DC-2 VH-USY crash-landed near Dimboola after engine fire. No loss of life and aircraft repaired.
- 29 May 1942, DH.89 VH-UXZ Marika crashed off Flinders Island into Bass Strait apparently after running out of fuel, all four on board drowned. The aircraft was later salvaged (without engines) from the sea; one engine was found fifty years later.
- 3 December 1943, DC-2 VH-ADQ crashed near Bendigo after the pilot lost his way on a flight from Sydney to Melbourne – the first officer was killed but the aircraft was repaired.
- 31 January 1945, Stinson Model A VH-UYY Tokana broke up in mid-air due to metal fatigue of a wing joint and crashed near Redesdale, killing all ten on board in the 1945 Australian National Airways Stinson crash
- 13 November 1945, C-49 VH-CDC crashed off Tacloban in the Philippines due to pilot error, killing 16 of 17 on board. The aircraft was operating for ANA on behalf of the USAAC.
- 10 March 1946. In the Seven-Mile Beach crash, DC-3 VH-AET plunged into the sea shortly after taking off from Cambridge Aerodrome, killing all 25 on board. An Air Court of Inquiry examined a number of theories that might explain the accident but found there was insufficient evidence to determine any one as the cause.
- 2 September 1948, Flight 331, operated by C-47 VH-ANK Lutana crashed into high terrain near Nundle, New South Wales due to navigation equipment errors, killing all 13 on board.
- 4 October 1948, DC-3 VH-ABR Kanana crash-landed near NW of Yass, New South Wales after an engine fire. No serious injuries and aircraft rebuilt (still flying in 2021).
- 8 November 1948, DC-3 VH-UZK Kurana on Mount Macedon, Victoria after an unauthorised change of course by the captain, who was killed along with his first officer. Miraculously the hostess and nineteen passengers survived.
- 29 December 1948, VH-UZJ Kyilla crash-landed near Mangalore, Victoria after the pilot misjudged his altitude while landing and touched the ground at high speed. No serious injuries, but aircraft damaged beyond repair.

Many of these accidents were put down to human error (generally on the part of the pilots), and a tightening of operational policies seemed to have arrested the problem. A final disaster was:

- 26 June 1950, DC-4 VH-ANA Amana crashed near York, Western Australia killing all 29 on board (a passenger survived the immediate crash but later died of his injuries). The aircraft lost power on most engines and the crew had only just managed to stabilise fuel supply by isolating the "offending" cross-flow lines and regain power when they ran out of altitude. The crash of the company's flagship was a blow to ANA's prestige and contrasted dramatically with rival TAA's record which, at that stage, was unblemished.

== Bibliography ==
- Carter I.R., Southern Cloud, Lansdowne Press, Melbourne (Victoria), 1963
