= Holleman =

Holleman is a surname. Notable people with the surname include:

- Boyce Holleman (1924–2003), American war veteran, attorney, politician, and actor
- Frederik David Holleman (1887–1958), Dutch and South African professor, ethnologist, and legal scholar
- Joel Holleman (1799–1844), American politician and lawyer from Virginia
- Johan Frederik Holleman (1915–2001), Dutch and South African professor, ethnologist, legal scholar, and author
- Kim Holleman (born 1973), mid-career contemporary artist with interdisciplinary approach
- Mitch Holleman (born 1994), American child actor, plays Jake Hart on the TV sitcom Reba
- Saskia Holleman (1945–2013), Dutch actress, lawyer and model

== See also ==
- Holleman Elementary, school in Waller, Texas
- Samuel Bartley Holleman House, historic home located in New Hill, North Carolina

- Hallman (disambiguation)
- Halman (disambiguation)
- Hellman
- Helman
- Hileman (disambiguation)
- Hillman
- Holliman
- Hollman
- Hollmann
- Holloman
- Hollowman
- Holman (disambiguation)
- Holmen (disambiguation)
- Holmon
- Holmön
- Holyman (disambiguation)
- Hulman (disambiguation)
- Ohlman
