= Idenburg =

Idenburg is a surname. Notable people with the surname include:

- Alexander Willem Frederik Idenburg (1861–1935), Dutch politician
- Florian Idenburg (born 1975), Dutch architect
- Petrus Johannes Idenburg (1898–1989), Dutch jurist
- Philip Idenburg (1901–1995), Dutch educationalist and statistician
