= African Studies Centre Leiden =

Scientific institute in the Netherlands

African Studies Centre, Leiden
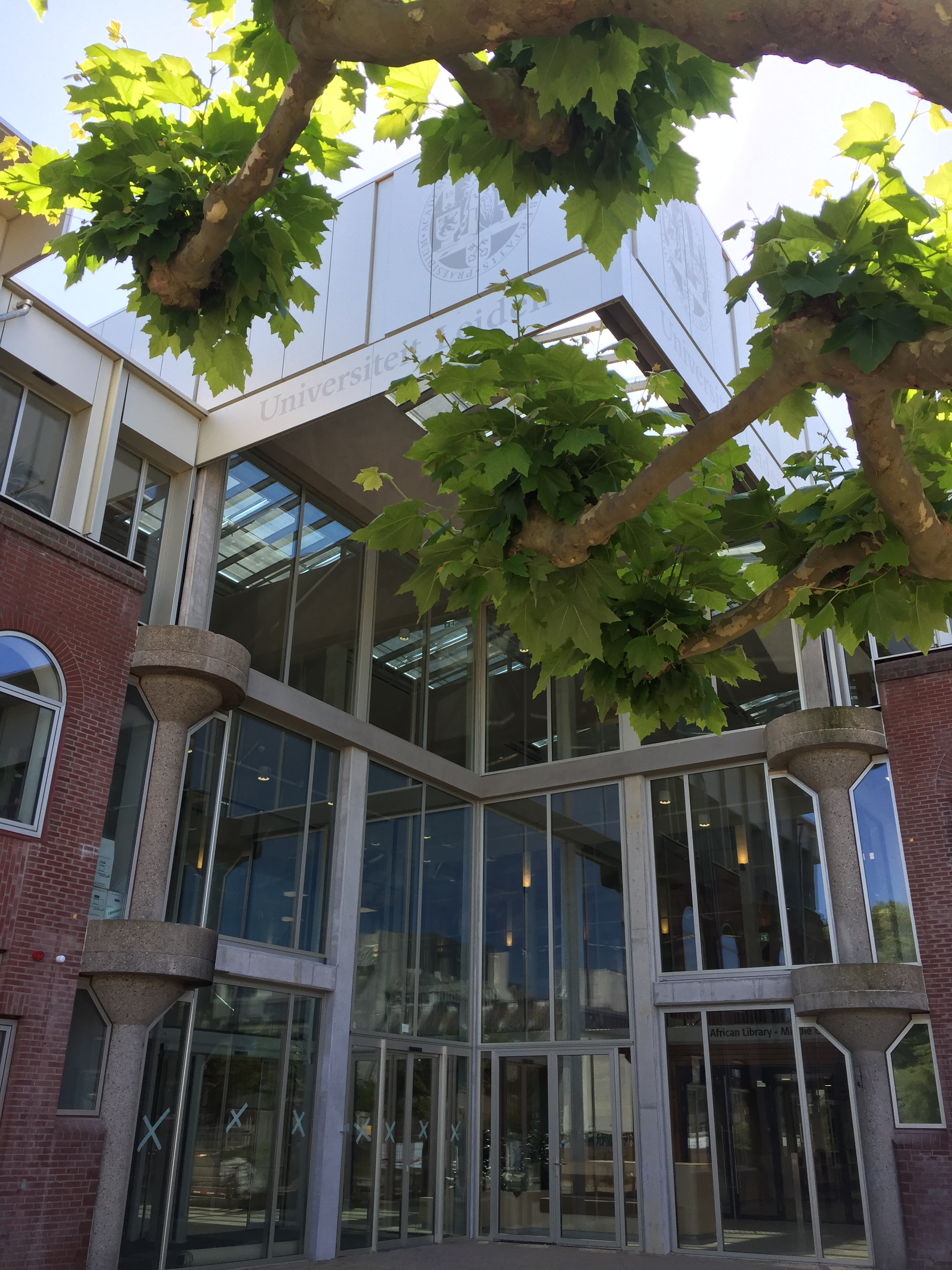
- The Herta Mohr Building in Leiden, where the African Studies Centre is located

- Location within Netherlands Location within Europe
- Abbreviation: ASC Leiden
- Coordinates: 52°09′24″N 4°28′54″E
- Director: Marleen Dekker
- Website: http://www.ascleiden.nl

The African Studies Centre (Dutch: Afrika-Studiecentrum) is a scientific institute in the Netherlands that undertakes social-science research on Africa with the aim of promoting a better understanding of historical, current and future social developments in Sub-Saharan Africa. The centre is an interfaculty institute of Leiden University. The present director since 2021 is Marleen Dekker. The institute is located in the Herta Mohr Building of Leiden University's Faculty of Humanities.

== Research ==
The research of the Afrika-Studiecentrum Leiden covers four themes: politics and security, society, religion and culture, and economics and history.

Various projects study international relations of African countries with the BRIC countries (Brazil, Russia, India and China) and the Arab states of the Persian Gulf, economic development and entrepreneurship, and processes in African politics and legislation. Other areas of research are language use in social movements in Africa, new developments in healthcare through telecommunications and e-health (electronic health), natural conservation and African historiography.

The Afrika-Studiecentrum publishes scientific articles and various books about its research, in-house or in collaboration with publishers such as Brill, including the Africa Yearbook and the series African Dynamics, the African Studies Collection, and the Africa Study Center Series. The topics range from international migration to social aspects of football in Africa. Most books also appear in an electronic (online) version. The Afrika-Studiecentrum annually awards a prize for the best Master's thesis in the field.

== Library ==
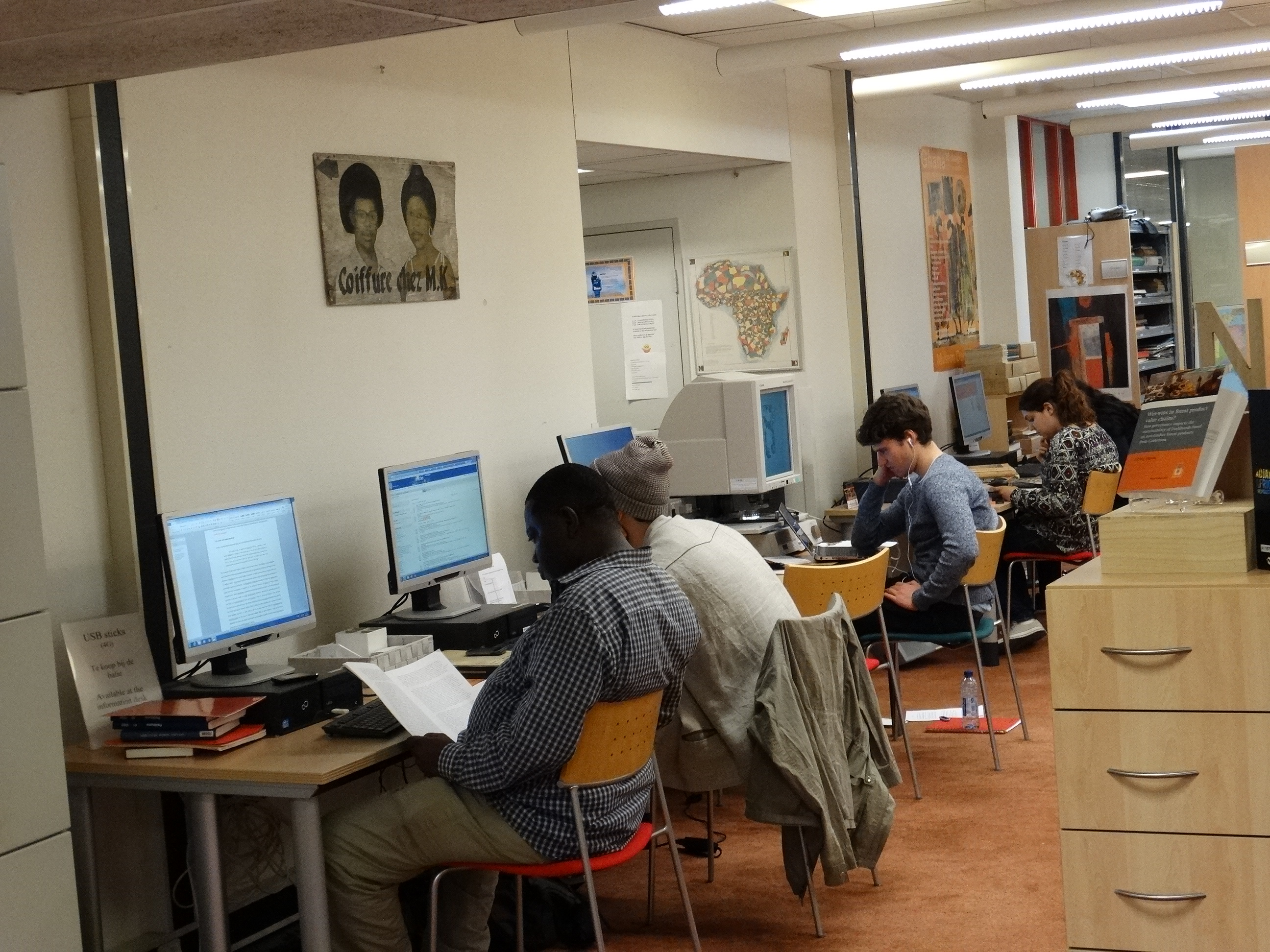
Library

The centre's library consists of some 100,000 books and about 2,000 journals (including electronic journals), government reports, brochures, African newspapers and about 2,500 documentaries and feature films on video and DVD. The centre has also developed a web service, Connecting-Africa, with links to more than 94,000 online articles about Africa. The library also has a collection of archival material including archives of African government publications and a number of personal archives.

== History ==
The centre was founded on 12 August 1947 as the academic division of an Afrika Instituut, which initially also had an economic section, later spun off as the Netherlands-African Business Council. Over the years, many well-known Dutch Africanists have worked at the African Studies Centre, including the poet Vernie February, the activist Klaas de Jonge, the sociologist Robert Buijtenhuijs and the law professor and film director Emile van Rouveroy van Nieuwaal. Legal scholar Hans Holleman served as a director from 1963 to 1969. Barbara Harrell-Bond worked at the centre in the 1970s, as did Deborah Bryceson in the 1990s. Kofi Abrefa Busia, who later became prime minister of Ghana from 1969 to 1972, worked at the African Studies Centre between 1959 and 1962. Former director Stephen Ellis was editor-in-chief of Africa Confidential. Petrus Johannes Idenburg, lector of African constitutional law at Leiden University, was one of the founders of the centre.

The centre was one of the founders of the Africa-Europe Group for Interdisciplinary Studies, a network of African Studies Centres in Europe that was set up in 1991 to build upon the resources and research potential available within Africanist institutions in Europe.

As of 1 January 2016, the African Studies Centre is a part of Leiden University. On 1 April 2021, Marleen Dekker became the new director of the ASC replacing Jan Bart Gewald who had been director since 2017.

== Notable people connected with the Centre ==
Many Dutch Africanists are or have been connected to the African Studies Centre, like the poet Vernie February, the sociologist and later anti-apartheid activist Klaas de Jonge, de bestuursambtenaar Lucien Adam, the anthropologist Bonno Thoden van Velzen, the sociologist Robert Buijtenhuijs, professor Emile van Rouveroy van Nieuwaal, the anthropologist Wouter van Beek, and historian Anne-Lot Hoek. Between 1959 en 1962 Kofi Abrefa Busia, the later prime minister of Ghana, was a researcher at ASC. In the eighties, former director-Stephen Ellis was chief editor of Africa Confidential. Board members in the first years were prof.mr. Frederik Mari baron van Asbeck, mr. Karel Paul van der Mandele en mr. Petrus Johannes Idenburg.

== Publications ==
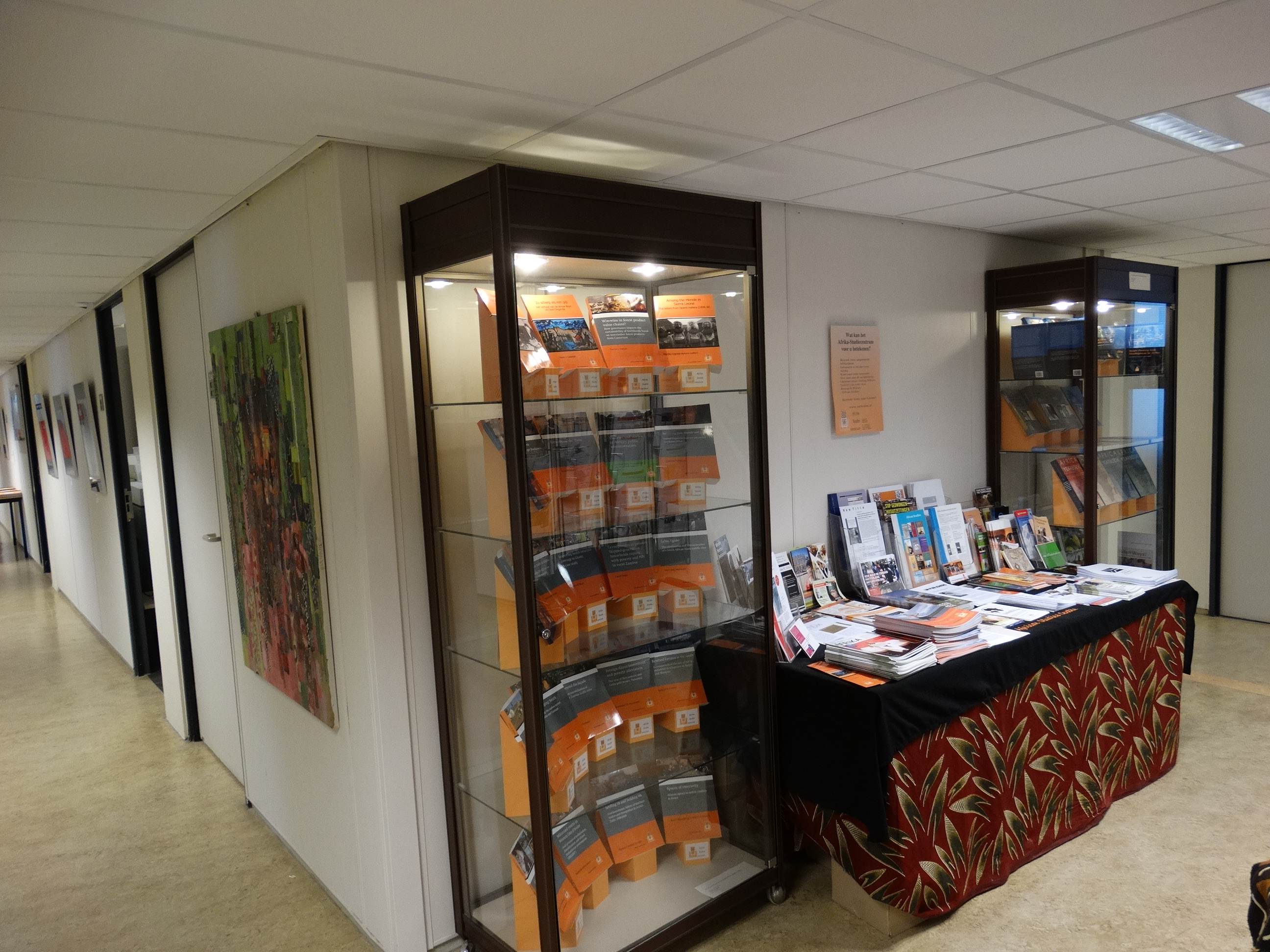
Publications of the ASC

The centre publishes extensively, sometimes in cooperation with publishers such as Brill Publishers in Leiden. ASC publications include:

- Africa Yearbook (ISSN 1871-2525)
- African Studies Abstracts Online (ISSN 1570-937X)
- Kroniek van Afrika (Chronicles of Africa, 1961-1975, ISSN 0023-4893)

== See also ==
- Tears of rain: Ethnicity and history in central western Zambia
