= Helmanis =

Helmanis (feminine: Helmane) is a Latvian surname of German origin (from German surname Hellmann). Notable people with the surname include:

- Krišs Helmanis (born 2002), Latvian basketball player
- Egils Helmanis (born 1971), Latvian politician
- Kristaps Helmanis (1848–1892), Latvian vaccinologist and microbiologist
- Uvis Helmanis (born 1972), Latvian basketball player
