= Gelman =

Gelman is a variant spelling of Helman. Notable people with the surname include:

- Alexander Gelman (born 1960), Russian-American theater director
- Alexander Isaakovich Gelman (born 1933), Russian playwright
- Andrew Gelman (born 1965), American statistician
- Brett Gelman (born 1976) American actor and comedian
- Jacques Gelman (1909–1986), Mexican film producer and art collector
- Juan Gelman (1930–2014), Argentine poet
- Kimiko Gelman (born 1966), American actress
- Larry Gelman (1930–2021), American actor
- Macarena Gelman (born 1976), Uruguayan activist, granddaughter of Juan Gelman
- Maksim Gelman (born 1987), convicted spree killer in New York City
- Marat Gelman (born 1960), Russian politician and art collector
- Michael Gelman (born 1961), American executive producer for TV talk show Live with Kelly and Ryan
- Polina Gelman (1919–2005), Soviet military pilot and World War II heroine
- Rochel Gelman (born 1942), Canadian psychologist
- Susan Gelman (born 1957), professor at the University of Michigan
- Susie Gelman, American activist
- Woody Gelman (1915–1978), American cartoonist
- Yury Gelman (born 1955), Ukrainian-born American Olympic fencing coach

== See also ==
- Estelle and Melvin Gelman Library, main library of The George Washington University
- Gellman
- Murray Gell-Mann
