= Jaap Schrieke =

Dutch administrator and jurist (1884–1976)

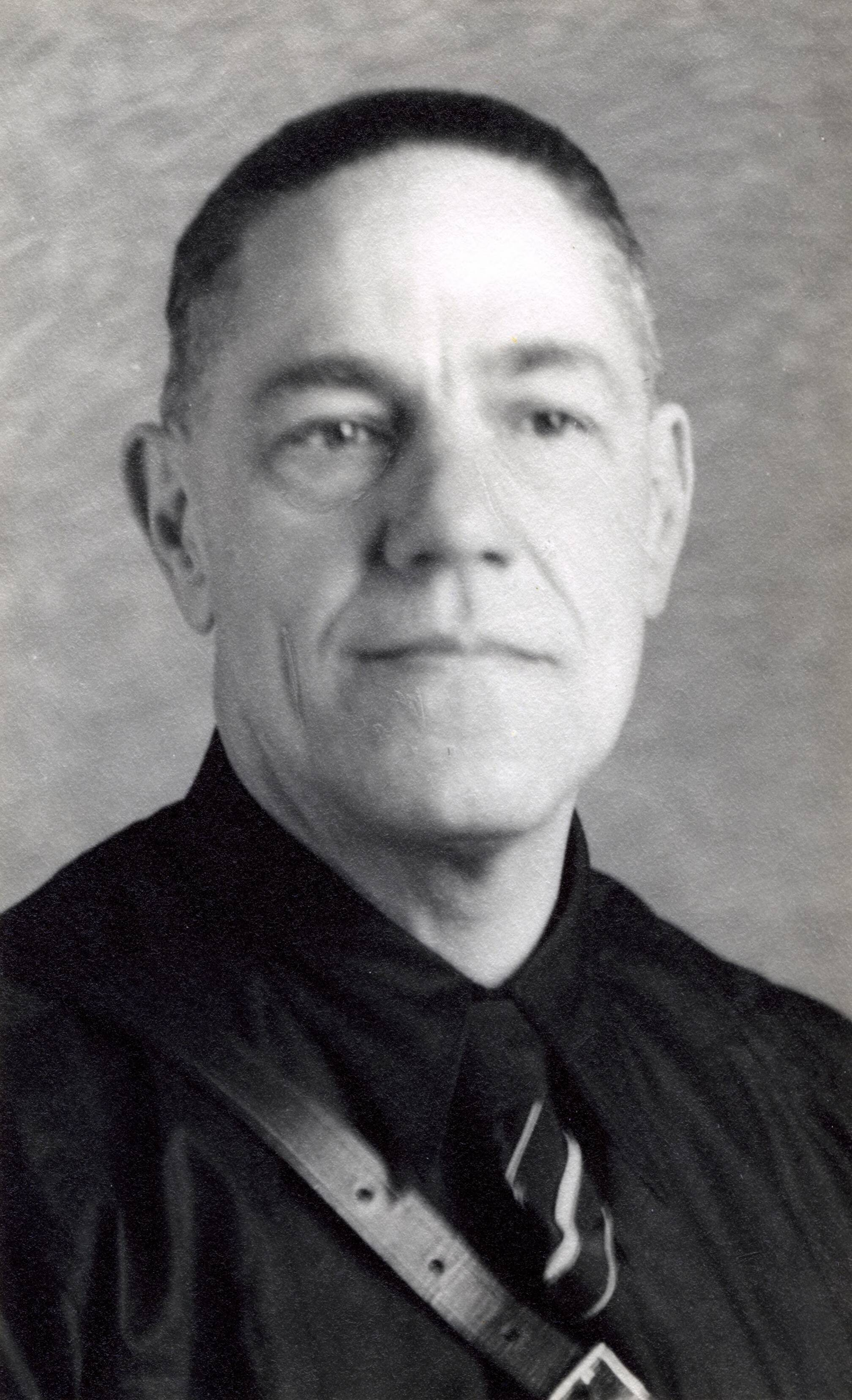
- Prof. J.J. Schrieke
- Born: Jacobus Johannes Schrieke; 17 October 1884; Pijnacker
- Died: 15 April 1976 (aged 91); Ede
- Education: Leiden University
- Occupations: Professor, Administrator
- Years active: 1940-1945
- Known for: Administrator during the German occupation of the Netherlands; member of the National Socialist Movement in the Netherlands

Jacobus Johannes 'Jaap' Schrieke (17 October 1884 – 15 April 1976) was a Dutch administrator, jurist, and collaborator who served as Secretary-General of the Dutch Ministry of Justice during the German occupation of the Netherlands. He was also the brother of the Dutch jurist and politician Bep Schrieke who briefly served as minister of education during the fifth Colijn government in 1939.

== Biography ==
Schrieke was born in Pijnacker in the Netherlands in 1884. He studied law and Indonesian (adat) law at the Leiden University in the Netherlands and was awarded a PhD in law in 1908. After his studies, he moved to the Dutch East Indies, and in 1909 he became a clerk at the Council of Justice in Batavia (now Jakarta) in the Dutch East Indies (now Indonesia). Following a successful career in management, in 1933 he failed to be elected to the post of Vice-Chairperson of the Council of the Dutch East Indies. Schrieke then returned to the Netherlands, and in 1935 was appointed an extraordinary professor of Constitutional and Administrative law for the Dutch East Indies, Suriname, and Curaçao at Leiden University. In this capacity, he, along with Frederik David Holleman, acted as successors to Cornelis van Vollenhoven, a leading Dutch legal scholar who had died in 1933.

During World War II, from 15 May 1940 to 5 May 1945, the Netherlands was occupied by Nazi Germany. During the occupation, Dutch public administration continued, though under German control. In March 1941, the acting Secretary-General of Justice, Jan Coenraad Tenkink, resigned and Friedrich Wimmer, the German Commissioner General for Administration and Justice, appointed Schrieke to the position of Secretary-General of Justice as Tenkin's successor. From 1942 to the end of the occupation, Schrieke was the acting Secretary-General in the Ministry for General Affairs, and between 1 March 1943 and 5 May 1945, he was also the acting Director-General for the Police.

At the request of the German authorities, Schrieke provided a list of all Jewish detainees in Dutch asylums. However, Schrieke also believed that the Dutch administration should continue without political interference, and as a result, he banned National-Socialist propaganda in his department. He also refused to take an oath of loyalty to Anton Mussert, the leader of the National Socialist Movement in the Netherlands (NSB).

After the war, Schrieke was condemned to death. This sentence was later commuted to a prison sentence of twenty years. On 15 October 1955, he was granted early release on medical grounds. He died in Ede in the Netherlands in 1976.
