= Hellman =

Hellman is a surname. Notable people with the surname include:

- Åke Hellman (1915–2017), Finnish centenarian, painter, and art professor
- C. Doris Hellman (1910–1973), American historian of science
- Danny Hellman (born 1964), American freelance illustrator and cartoonist
- Frances Hellman, American physicist
- Geoffrey Hellman, American professor and philosopher
- Geoffrey T. Hellman (1907–1977), American writer and editor
- George S. Hellman (1878-1958), American writer and art collector
- Herman W. Hellman (1843–1906), German-born Jewish businessman, banker, and real estate investor
- Ilse Hellman (1908–1998), Austrian-British psychoanalyst
- Isaias W. Hellman (1842–1920), German-born American banker and philanthropist
- Jakob Hellman (born 1965), Swedish pop singer
- Jörgen Hellman (born 1963), Swedish politician
- Lillian Hellman (1905–1984), American dramatist and screenwriter
- Louis Hellman (born 1936), British architect and cartoonist
- Martin Hellman (born 1945), American cryptologist
- Matilda Hellman (born 1974), Finnish sociologist
- Monte Hellman (1932–2021), American film director, producer, writer, and editor
- Neal Hellman (born 1948), American folk musician, music teacher, and mountain dulcimer performer
- Ocean Hellman (born 1971), Canadian actress
- Richard A. Hellman (born 1940), American environmental consultant and attorney
- Thomas Hellman (born 1975), French-Canadian singer, songwriter, radio columnist, and author
- Vesa Hellman (born 1970), Finnish wheelchair curler and Paralympian
- Walter Hellman (1916–1975), American checkers player
- Warren Hellman (1934–2011), American private equity investor

== See also ==
- Hellman Building, several buildings in Los Angeles, California
- Hellmann
- Helman
