= Hekman =

Hekman is a surname. Notable people with the surname include:

- David R. Hekman (born 1978), American academic
- Susan Hekman (born 1949), feminist academic

== See also ==
- Helman
