= Bep Schrieke =

Dutch politician and academic

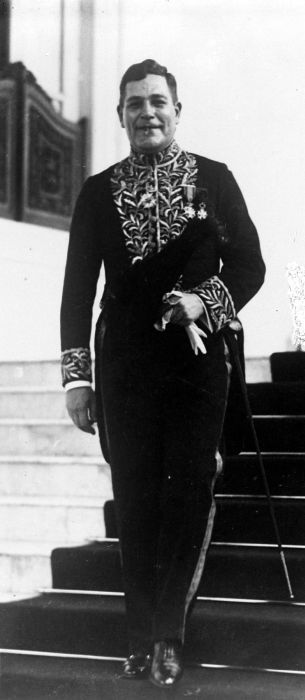

Bertram 'Bep' Johannes Otto Schrieke (18 September 1890, Zandvoort, Netherlands – 12 September 1945, London, England) was a Dutch politician and academic. He served, alongside Frederik David Holleman, as a professor of ethnology and history of the Dutch East Indies (now Indonesia) in Batavia (now Jakarta). From 1939 to 1945 he served as director of the Department of Ethnology at the Colonial Institute, now the Royal Tropical Institute, in Amsterdam. He later served as education minister in the cabinet of Colijn V (the fifth cabinet of Hendrikus Colijn). He was also the brother of Jaap Schrieke, a Dutch administrator during the German occupation of the Netherlands.

== See also ==
Political offices
Preceded by Jan Rudolph Slotemaker de Bruïne	Minister of Education, Arts and Sciences; 1939	Succeeded by Gerrit Bolkestein
