= Roman Palester =

Polish composer (1907–1989)

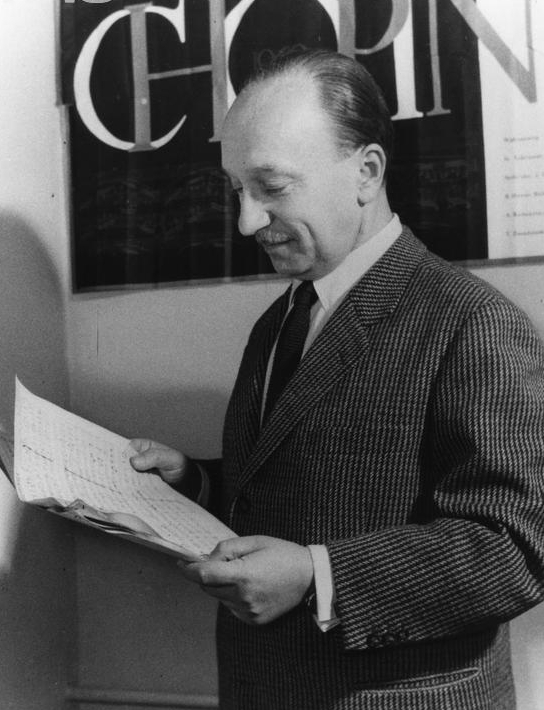
Roman Palester

Roman Palester (28 December 1907 – 25 August 1989) was a Polish composer of classical music. Palester composed his most significant work during the 1960s and was the first Polish musician to be awarded the Alfred Jurzykowski Prize in 1964. His work was individual in style and not noticeably Polish in character.

Palester was born in Śniatyń in Austrian Galicia, in 1907. At the age of seven he started piano lessons and by age twelve was studying at the Music Institute in Kraków. In 1925, he began to study art history at Warsaw University. Palester graduated from the Warsaw Conservatory with a degree in music theory and composition in 1931, having studied under Kazimierz Sikorski. His first recognition came in 1932 when his "Psalm V for Baritone, Choir and Orchestra" was awarded first place in the Competition of the Singers’ Societies Association .

Palester travelled extensively during his life and lived at different times in Warsaw, Paris, and Munich. In 1940, during the German occupation of Poland, he was briefly imprisoned in Warsaw's Pawiak prison. Both before and just after the Second World War he composed film scores for a number of major Polish cinematic productions of those times. By the late 1940s Palester was widely regarded as one of Poland's greatest living composers, alongside Grażyna Bacewicz and Andrzej Panufnik. While in Munich, Palester worked for Radio Free Europe, as the head of its Polish culture department and as the presenter of a series entitled "Music Abolishes the Frontiers." Both the station's acutely anti-communist stance and his own refusal to adopt the principles of Socialist Realism led Palester to be exiled from Poland; communist officials expunged both his name and scores from official publications and prohibited public performances of his work. He continued to compose abroad, and as of the mid-1950s Palester experimented with twelve-tone serialism. In 1963, he completed what has been described as his greatest work, "Śmierć Don Juana" ("Don Juan’s Death").

Although his compositions were highly regarded across Europe, it was not until the late 1970s that the Polish Composers' Union lifted the censorship ban on his work. In recent years, Palester’s music has largely fallen from the public view in Poland, in part due to his emigration to France. He remains highly regarded amongst specialists, but to date no revival of his work has caught the mainstream imagination. In 1999, Zofia Helman wrote a monograph on his work in an attempt to restore Palester's position as a significant modern Polish composer. Describing Palester's individuality, Helman wrote that he stood as an example of "new compositional thinking, different not only from the musical production of the early 1950s that was burdened by Socialist Realist ideology, but also from the autonomous Neoclassical current that remained dominant among Polish composers".

== Selected works ==
- "Psalm V", Baritone, Mixed choir and Orchestra, 1931.
- "A Dance from Osmoloda" for Symphony Orchestra, 1933.
- "Symphony No. 1", Orchestra, 1935.
- "The Song of the Earth", Ballet in 3 Scenes, 1937.
- "Concertino" for Alto Saxophone and Strings, 1938 (rev. 1978).
- "Nocturne" for String Orchestra, 1947.
- "Requiem" for 4 Solo Voices (SATB), Mixed Choir and Orchestra, 1947.
- "The Vistula", Cantata for Reciting Voice, Mixed Choir and Chamber Ensemble, 1948.
- "Passacaglia" (for orchestra) (1957)
- "Don Juan’s Death", Orchestra, 1963.
- "Three Poems by Czesław Miłosz" for Soprano and 12 Instruments, 1977.
- "Concerto for Viola and Orchestra", 1978.
- "Hymnus pro gratiarum actione", Children’s choir, Mixed choir, and Instrumental ensemble, 1979.
- "Symphony No. 5", 1981.
- "Letters to Mother", Cantata for Baritone and Chamber Orchestra, 1984.

== Selected filmography ==
- Róża (1936)
- The Girls from Nowolipki (1937)
