= Ineke van Wetering =

Dutch anthropologist

Wilhelmina (Ineke) van Wetering (17 October 1934, Hilversum - 18 October 2011, Huijbergen) was a Dutch anthropologist and Surinamist.

She was born on 17 October 1934 in the Dutch city of Hilversum. When she was 10 years old, her father (ironmonger) had been executed by firing squad in the Second World War because of participating in an illegal group who provided hiding places for people who were prosecuted by the Nazi-German army. She finished her secondary school in 1955, when she began her study of sociology at the University of Amsterdam. In her later career she continued her work at the Vrije Universiteit Amsterdam.

Ineke van Wetering met her life partner, Bonno Thoden van Velzen, during her study, with whom she has been in field from May 1961 to November 1962. After her field work she wrote her dissertation about the role of witchcraft in the Ndyuka society, which is one of the six Maroon groups in the hinterland of Suriname. From 1961 to 2010, she dedicated her work on religion and witchcraft in the Ndyuka society, primarily writing books in cooperation with Bonno Thoden van Velzen. In 2010 Ineke van Wetering was diagnosed with a debilitating disease, nonetheless carrying on her works Makandra vrouwenrituelen en Creools-Surinaamse identiteit in Suriname and Een Zwarte Vrijstaat in Suriname, which has been published in 2013.

== Bibliography ==
- 'Residence, power and intra-societal aggression', in: International Archives of Ethnography 49, 1960, pp. 169–200 [met H.U.E. Thoden van Velzen].
- 'Conflicten tussen co-vrouwen bij de Djuka', in: Nieuwe West-Indische Gids 45 (1), 1966, pp. 52–59.
- Hekserij bij de Djoeka; een sociologische benadering. Proefschrift Universiteit van Amsterdam, 1968.
- 'On the Political Impact of a Prophetic Movement in Surinam', in: W.E.A. van Beek and J.H. Scherer (eds.), Explorations in the Anthropology of Religion; Essays in Honour of Jan van Baal. (Verhandelingen van het Koninklijk Instituut voor Taal-, Land en Volkenkunde 74). The Hague: Martinus Nijhoff, 1975, p. 215-233 [met H.U.E. Thoden van Velzen].
- 'The Origins of the Gaan Gadu Movement of the Bush Negroes of Surinam', in: Nieuwe West-Indische Gids 52, 1978, nr. 3/4, p. 81-130 [met H.U.E. Thoden van Velzen].
- 'Mati en lesbiennes; homoseksualiteit en etnische identiteit bij Creools-Surinaamse vrouwen in Nederland', in: Sociologische Gids 32(5/6), 1985, pp. 394–415 [met M. J. Janssens].
- ‘Een sociaal vangnet: quasi verwantschap, religie en sociale orde bij de Creoolse Surinamers in de Bijlmermeer’, in: Sociologische Gids 33, 1986.
- 'Over feministische antropologie: De Groep en haar zaakwaarnemers'. Sociologische Gids 34, 1987, pp. 221–247
- 'The ritual laundering of black money among Suriname Creoles in the Netherlands', in: Philip Quarles van Ufford and Matthew Schoffeleers (eds.), Religion and Development: Towards an Integrated Approach. Amsterdam: Free University Press, 1988.
- The Great Father and the Danger: Religious Cults, Material Forces, and Collective Fantasies in the World of the Surinamese Maroons. Dordrecht: Foris, 1988 [met H.U.E. Thoden van Velzen].
- ‘Demonologie en de betovering van het moderne leven’, in: Sociologische Gids 36, 1989.
- ‘Een demon in de stortkoker’, in: Sociologische Gids 36, 1989 [onder pseudoniem Mildred Kuiperbak].
- 'Rosca's, etniciteit en strategie: kasmoni bij Creools-Surinaamse vrouwen in Amsterdam', in: Marcel van der Linden en Jacqueline Sluijs (eds), Onderlinge Hulpfondsen. Amsterdam: Stichting Beheer IISG, 1996.
- 'Witchcraft among the Tapanahoni Djuka, in: Richard Price (ed), Maroon Societies: Rebel Slave Communities in the Americas. Baltimore / London: The Johns Hopkins University Press, 1996.
- 'Mati: the lures and dangers of utopianism in lesbian studies' in: Thamyris 5, nr. 1, 1998, pp. 131–139.
- 'Dangerous Creatures and the Enchantment of Modern Life', in: P. Clough & J.P. Mitchell (eds.), Powers of Good and Evil: Moralities, Commodities and Popular Belief. New York/Oxford: Berghahn, 2001, p. 17-42 [met H.U.E. Thoden van Velzen].
- 'Ndyuka', in: Melvin Ember, Carol R. Ember, and Ian Skoggard (eds.), Encyclopedia of World Cultures, Supplement. New York: MacMillan Reference USA, 2002, p. 224-227 [met H.U.E. Thoden van Velzen].
- In the Shadow of the Oracle: Religion as Politics in a Suriname Maroon Society. Long Grove: Waveland Press, 2004 [met H.U.E. Thoden van Velzen].
- 'Violent Witch Finders and the Suspension of Social Order in a Suriname Maroon Society', in: Rob van Ginkel en Alex Strating (eds.), Wildness and Sensation: Anthropology of Sinister and Sensuous Realm. Apeldoorn/Antwerpen: Het Spinhuis, 2007, p. 157-176 [met H.U.E. Thoden van Velzen].
- Een Zwarte Vrijstaat in Suriname. De Okaanse Samenleving in de 19e en 20e eeuw. Leiden: E.J. Brill, 2013 [met H.U.E. Thoden van Velzen].
