= Halman =

Halman may refer to:

== Boats ==
- Halman 20, a Canadian sailboat design

== Places ==
- Halman, Iran, a village in Kermanshah Province, Iran
