= Philip Idenburg =

Dutch educationalist and statistician (1901–1995)

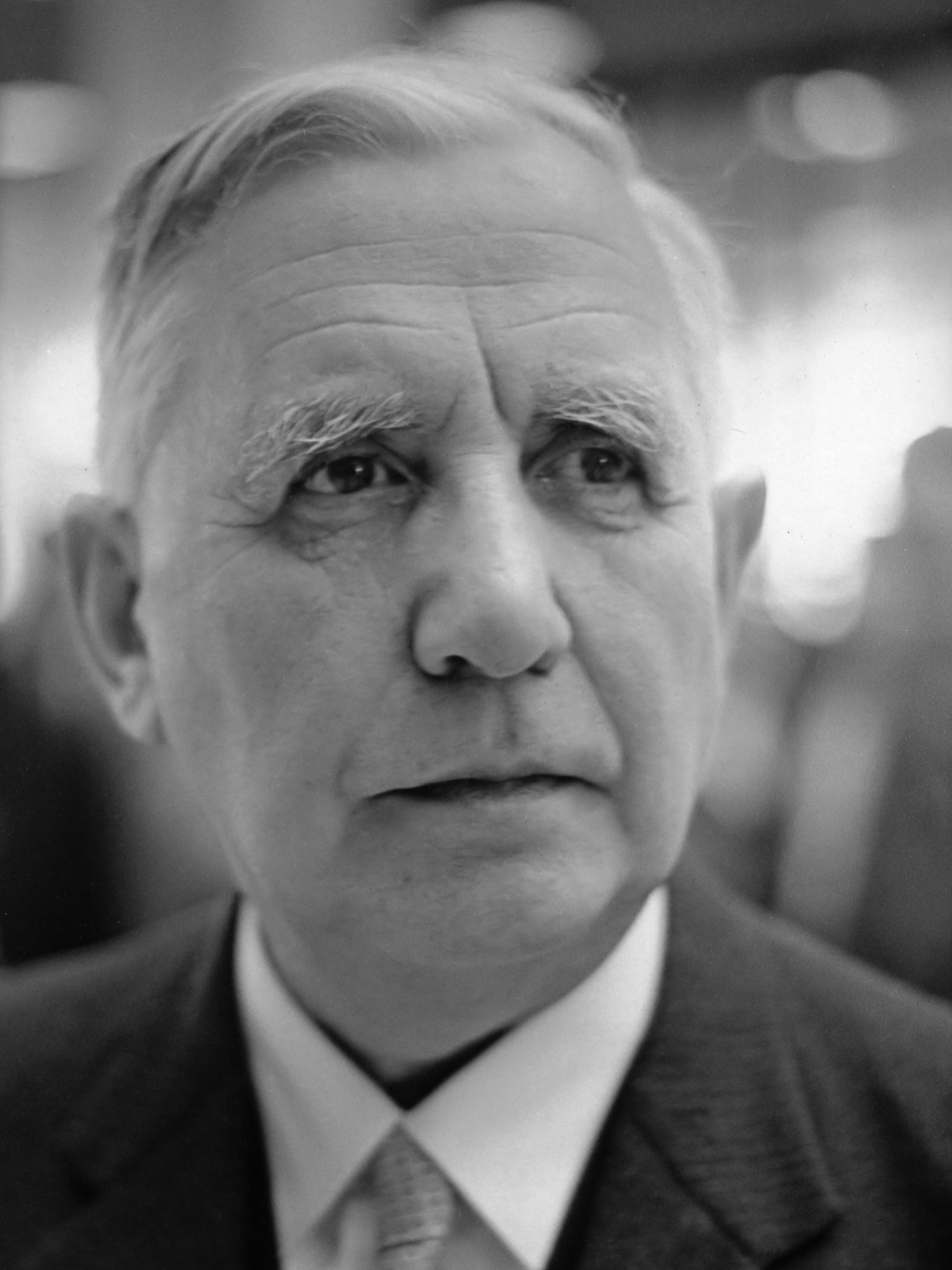
Philip Idenburg (1968)

Philip Idenburg in public information film about the census (9 May 1947)

Philippus Jacobus Idenburg (Hillegersberg, 26 November 1901 – Wassenaar, 29 December 1995) was a Dutch educationalist and statistician.

Philip joined the Centraal Bureau voor de Statistiek (the Dutch Central Bureau of Statistics) where he worked except for a short break until retirement in 1966. In 1940 he was involved with Gerd Arntz in salvaging the work of the Mundaneum in The Hague, transferring the material to the Dutch Foundation for Statistics which he set up under the leadership of Jan van Ettinger and Arntz. In 1943 Arntz was conscripted into the German Army, and when he returned to the Netherlands in 1946, Idenburg vouched for him and enabled him to return to his previous job. Philip Jacobus Idenburg was a younger brother of Petrus Johannes Idenburg (1898–1989), a Dutch professor of constitutional law and founder of the Afrika-Studiecentrum, Leiden.

Philip was married to 1) Margaretha Jacoba Johanna (Puk) Kohnstamm, who died in 1956 at the age of 52 and 2) to Sarah Carla (Car) Kohnstamm, both daughters of Dutch pedagogue Philip Kohnstamm and his wife An Kessler.
