= Gellman =

Gellman is a surname. Notable people with the surname include:

- Barton Gellman (born 1960), American journalist and author
- Cameron Gellman (born 1998), Canadian actor
- Yani Gellman (born 1985), Canadian/American actor

== See also ==
- Gelman
- Murray Gell-Mann, winner of 1969 Nobel Prize in physics
