= Netherlands-African Business Council =

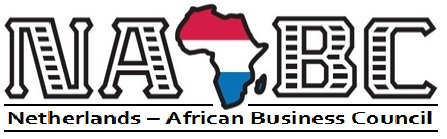
- Type: Private/Cooperative
- Industry: Business Service
- Founded: 1946
- Headquarters: The Hague, the Netherlands, 52°5′0″N 4°19′0″E,
- Key people: Managing director: Rosmarijn Fens since 2020; Chairman of the Supervisory Board: Frank Nagel since 2018
- Products: Networking; Seminars; Trade Missions
- Number of employees: 14 (2023)
- Website: www.nabc.nl
- Footnotes; Slogan: Confidence in African business

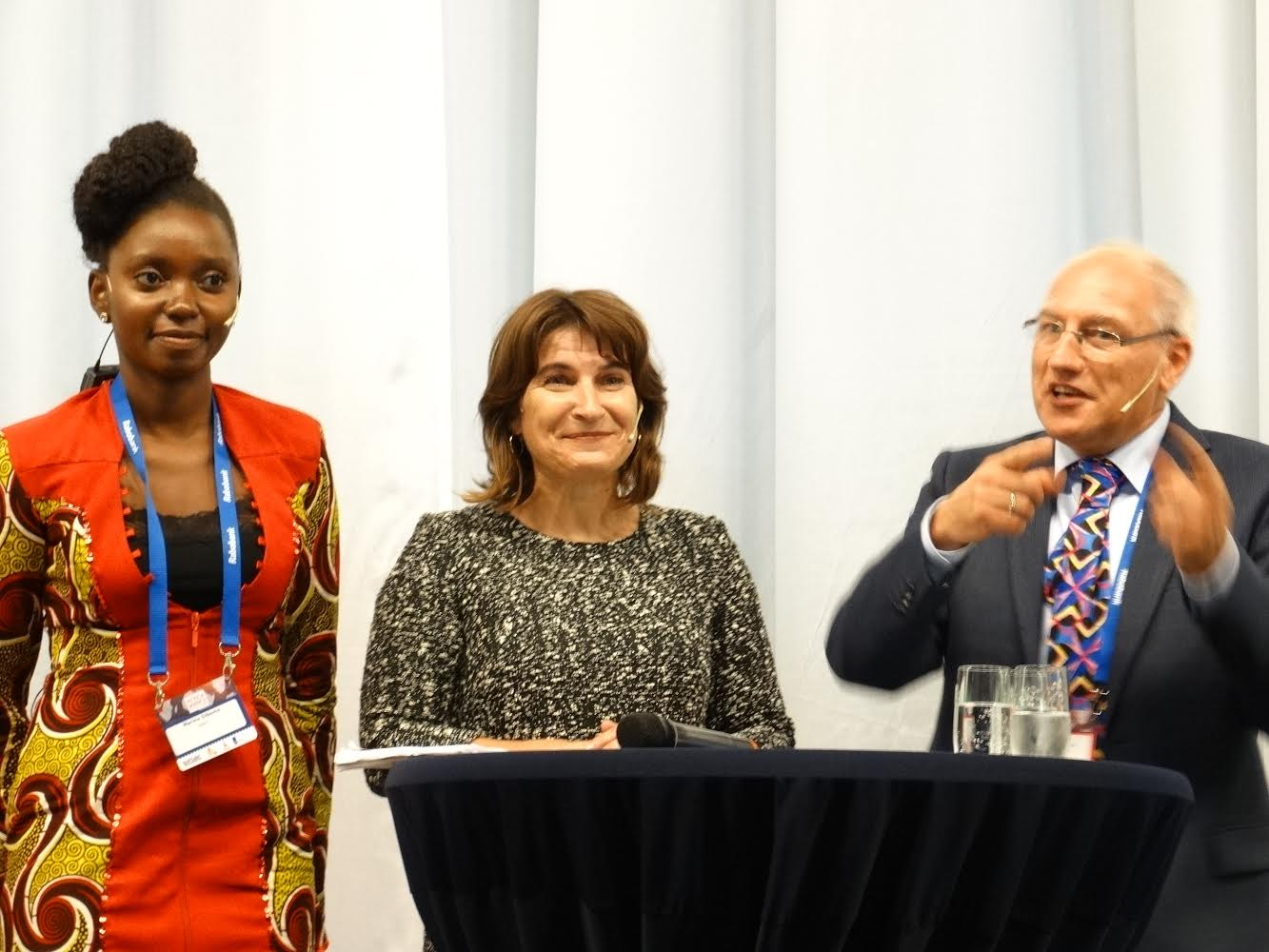
From left to right: Marina Diboma (Netherlands African Business Council NABC), Lilianne Ploumen (Dutch Ministry of Foreign Affairs) and Ton Dietz (African Studies Centre, Leiden) at the closing ceremony of Africa Works 2014 conference in Leiden, the Netherlands.

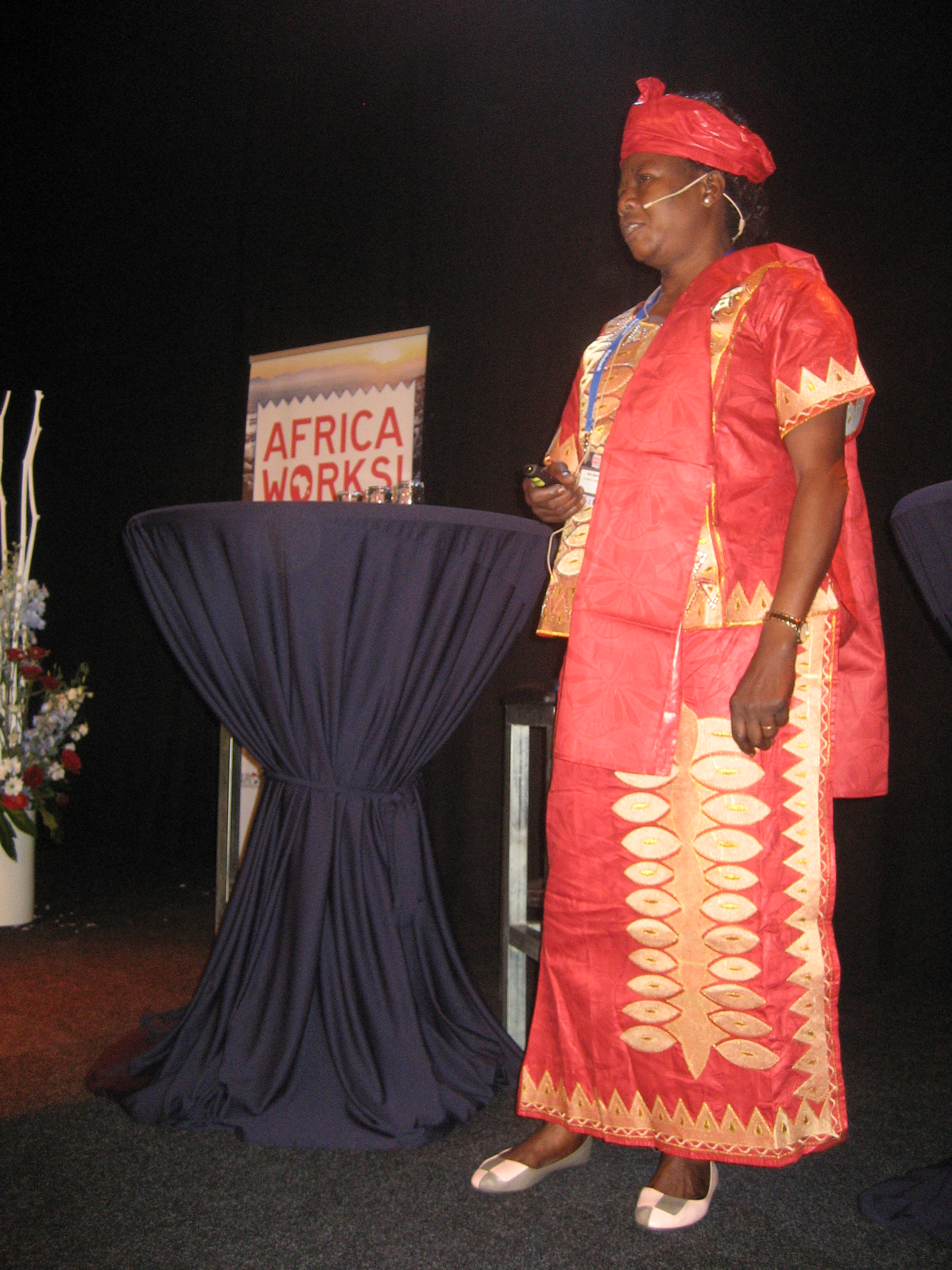
Betty Achan Ogwaro, parliamentarian and former minister in the government of South Sudan at Africa Works! Conference 2014, The Hague, the Netherlands.

Netherlands-African Business Council (NABC) is a non-profit organization for Dutch companies trading and investing in Africa and vice versa. It supports its members with their activities in Africa by promoting trade with the continent. NABC has been working around the world since it was set up by Heineken and other Dutch companies in 1946. The NABC celebrated their 70th year anniversary in 2016. The Netherlands-African Business Council in 2023 had nearly 250 members, both Dutch and African. The NABC has contacts and a wide database within the Netherlands and covers all countries in Africa.

== Members ==
The idea behind the NABC is as a business platform for companies that trade and invest in and with Africa to exchange reliable contacts and create business opportunities. The Netherlands-African Business Council currently has 440 company member companies, Dutch as well as African. These companies are active in all sectors of the private sector. Company size varies from entrepreneurial ships to multinational corporations such as Royal Dutch Shell, Heineken, Rabobank and Philips. Most member companies are in the Business Service sector, followed by Agriculture and Transport. The NABC supports members with problems and questions they might have in doing business with African companies and governments. Members get discounts on events and activities and get exclusive access to some events, such as the Africa Business Club.

== Services ==
Member companies get support with regards to questions and problems that may arise when business is done with African companies and governments. Next to this the NABC can connect member companies to African companies and governments by either providing contact details or serving as an intermediary.

- Trade missions to and from Africa covering different sectors and countries
- Organizing seminars, workshops and conferences on different sectors and companies
- Creating networking possibilities between companies within this market
- Offering contact details and matchmaking between African and Dutch companies
- Providing business information on the African (and Dutch) market through its media
- Support members with problems and questions they might have in doing business with African companies and governments

== Board members ==
NABC had six board members in 2023. The NABC board members have many years of experience in doing business with Africa. NABC shares these expertise with member companies both in the Netherlands and in Africa.

== Events ==
NABC organizes different events to keep companies in contact with other entrepreneurs and Africa's opportunities. Events are usually held in the Netherlands and mostly attended by the NABC members, businessmen looking for some matchmaking possibilities, ambassadors and speakers. The NABC organizes seminars that are informative afternoons where speakers from well-known companies or economic attachés from an African country talk about the business opportunities in that country and cover specific topics.

The Netherlands-African Business Council rarely organizes a conference but an example is the first Business Summit Netherlands-African 2010 on 3 November on ‘How to improve your Africa strategy’. Two hundred participants attended this conference which is the first of its kind covering African business opportunities. Many of NABC's African members flew over just to attend this event. The summit was a full day program in Castle The Wittenberg in Wassenaar (close to The Hague) with 5 workshops and 15 speakers of big Dutch firms that have been active in Africa for a long time. Speakers were present from companies such as Heineken, Rabobank, FMO, TNO, DSM, Philips and Vlisco.

== Trade missions ==
The Netherlands-African Business Council has the knowledge and experience essential for networking services for the Dutch and African private sector that trade with each other. NABC organizes a couple trade missions per year to and from Africa covering different sectors and countries. There are the incoming trade missions where delegates from a country come to the Netherlands for usually a couple of days to a week. The outgoing trade missions are usually subsidized by the CPA program in corporation with the NL EVD International, in 2023 part of the Dutch government Rijksdienst voor Ondernemend Nederland. NABC organizes their program, accommodation and transport. During their stay the participants visit some companies, meet some business people during matchmaking sessions and visit some governmental institutions.

Then are outgoing trade missions to African countries. The aim of these missions is to familiarize Dutch companies with the local business climate, introduce them to local partners and distributors, and to give them an insight into the local private sector development programs. Usually these are attended by 6 to 12 NABC members and sometimes non-members. Members pay their own ticket to the country and accommodation, NABC arranges local transport. To attend the program is free of charge. The NABC organizes a program with company visits and meetings at government institutes.
