= Johan Frederik Holleman =

Dutch-South African academic (1915–2001)

Hans Holleman
- Johan Frederik Holleman
- Born: Johan Frederik Holleman; 18 December 1915; Tulungagung, Dutch East Indies
- Died: 28 August 2001 (aged 85); Alphen aan den Rijn, Netherlands
- Occupations: Professor, ethnologist, legal scholar

Academic background
- Education: Stellenbosch University; University of Cape Town

Johan 'Hans' Frederik Holleman (18 December 1915 – 28 August 2001) was a Dutch and South African professor, ethnologist, and legal scholar, best known for his research into the indigenous legal systems of Southern Africa. During his life he published twenty books, including five works of fiction. He also published works using the pseudonyms 'Jacobus van der Blaeswindt' and 'Holmer Johanssen'. He is also known for his photography.

== Biography ==
Johan Holleman was born in Tulungagung in Java in the Dutch East Indies (now Indonesia) in 1915. His parents were Frederik David Holleman (1887–1958), a Dutch and South African ethnologist and legal scholar working in the Dutch colonial service and Adriana van Geijtenbeek (1889-1986). He was a descendant of the Holleman family who are recorded in Nederland's Patriciaat.

He studied law and ethnology at Stellenbosch University in South Africa, completing his bachelor's degree ethnology and Roman-Dutch Law in 1937, and his master's degree in ethnology (awarded cum laude) in 1938. During this time he became interested in the ethnography of Southern Africa, and lived in a Zulu kraal for a period of ten months. Here he studied Zulu customary law, and also photographed scenes of everyday life in traditional Zulu society. Holleman's photography was well received, and the subject of several photo exhibitions in Stellenbosch.

During this period his also published his first of several fiction books, a book called Gety which is regarded as an important contribution to New Realism.

Johan Holleman acquired South African citizenship in 1940. Between 1940 and 1945 he worked in the civil service, but was prevented from making full use of his knowledge of African Customary Law and instead 'banned' to Riversdal, far away from the African population. During his service there he also married his wife Marie Sem. In 1945, he left the civil service and, after a brief stint as an art director at a film company, was appointed a Beit Research Fellow at the Rhodes-Livingstone Institute in Lusaka in Northern Rhodesia (now Zambia). Here he participated in Max Gluckman's research into Southern and Central Africa.

For his doctorate Holleman studied under Isaac Schapera. He was awarded his PhD on Shona Family Law in Southern Rhodesia by the University of Cape Town in 1950.

He briefly worked as a curator at the Queen Victoria Memorial Museum in Salisbury, Southern Rhodesia (now Harare in Zimbabwe) before accepting a management position in the Department of Native Affairs of Bulawayo and Wedza. Here he conducted research into urbanization, and also made several recommendations to the Southern Rhodesian government regarding legal protection for migrant labourers. In 1958 he published the book African Interlude, which was a part academic, and part biographical book on his time spent in Southern Rhodesia. Chief, Council, and Commissioner published in 1969, was based on his research on urbanization during this time.

Between 1957 and 1962, he was a professor and director at the Institute of Social Research of the University of Natal in Durban, South Africa. He was invited by the Southern Rhodesian government to participate in the Mangwende Commission on the administrative and agricultural issues in the Murewa region. He served on the commission during the period 1960-1961, and wrote an influential report for the commission, arguing that much of the administrative issues in the Murewa region was the result of cultural misunderstanding between colonial administrators and the native population. As a result of this report, the government of Southern Rhodesia passed legislation requiring all colonial administrators to take courses in ethnography and management.

He moved to Leiden in the Netherlands in 1963. Here he served as professor of Sociology and Cultural Studies of Africa at the Institute for Cultural Anthropology of Non-Western Nations, as well as a director at the Afrika-Studiecentrum from 1963–69. In 1969, he was appointed professor of Customary Law at Leiden University as successor of Hans Keuning to the chair of Adat Law. Thus he followed in his father's footsteps, holding the same chair his father and Van Vollenhoven once did. He retired in 1979, one year before his mandatory retirement as his chair had been abolished, and because he wanted to focus on his translation of Cornelis van Vollenhoven's series of books on adat law in the Dutch East Indies. His chair at the university was retired at the same time.

Johan Holleman died in Alphen aan den Rijn in the Netherlands in 2001. The archives and photo collections of both Hollemans, along with their publications, may be found in the special collections of Leiden University Library, Museum Volkenkunde, and the Afrika-Studiecentrum library, all in Leiden.

== Selected bibliography ==
- Gety (1938, fiction, published under pseudonym Holmer Johanssen)
- African Interlude (1958)
- The attitudes of white mining employees towards life and work on the Copperbelt (1960, with S. Biesheuvel)
- Die Onterfdes (1965, fiction, published under pseudonym Holmer Johanssen)
- Shona customary law: with reference to kinship, marriage, the family and the estate (1969)
- Chief, Council, and Commissioner (1969)
- White mine workers in Northern Rhodesia, 1959-60 (1973, with S. Biesheuvel)
- Issues in African law (1974)
