= Deborah Fahy Bryceson =

American Africanist scholar

- Born: December 1, 1951 (age 74); United States
- Education: D.Phil, University of Oxford
- Occupation: Africanist

Deborah Fahy Bryceson is a British academic, emeritus professor and honorary fellow of the Centre of African Studies (CAS) at the University of Edinburgh and University of Uppsala. She pioneered research into sectoral change in Africa, looking primarily at 'transnational families' and coining the terms 'de-agrarianisation' and 'mineralized urbanization'. She has published 16 books and over 130 journal articles and book chapters, specialising on livelihood, labour, urbanization and agrarian studies.

== Early life and education ==
Born in the United States, Bryceson moved to Tanzania in 1971, where she obtained a BA and MA in Geography at the University of Dar es Salaam. She obtained a DPhil (Sociology) at the University of Oxford on African food insecurity.

== Academic career ==
Bryceson was a Senior Research Fellow at the Afrika-studiecentrum in Leiden between 1992 and 2005, which maintains a small archive of documents obtained during her research for her first publication, Food Insecurity and the Social Division of Labour in Tanzania.

Following her departure from the Africa-studiecentrum in Leiden, Bryceson took up the roles of Senior Lecturer and Reader at the Universities of Birmingham (2003–2004), Glasgow (2009–2013), respectively. Since 2014, she has held an Honorary Professorship at the Centre of African Studies, University of Edinburgh. Bryceson also consulted with various international agencies, including the ILO, World Bank, Dutch Ministry of Foreign Affairs and the then UK Department for International Development (now the Foreign Office).

Deborah Bryceson's main topics of study focus on the transformation of social and economic life in Sub-Saharan Africa. Bryceson's contributions to the field are found across the range of her publications – with her most notable being the definition of the concepts of 'de-agrarianization', 'transnational families' and 'mineralized urbanization'.

== Publications ==
- Bryceson, Deborah Food Insecurity and the Social Division of Labour in Tanzania, 1919–1985. 1990. London: Macmillan
- Bryceson, Deborah Liberalizing Tanzania's Food Trade: Public & Private Faces of Urban Marketing Policy 1939–1988. 1993. London: James Currey Publishers
- Bryceson, Deborah et al. Women Wielding the Hoe: Lessons from Rural Africa for Feminist Theory and Development Practice. (ed.) 1995. Oxford: Berg Publishers
- Bryceson, Deborah & Jamal, Vali Farewell to Farms: De-agraianization and Employment in Africa (ed.) 1997. Aldershot: Ashgate
- Bryceson, Deborah, Kay, Cristobal & Mooij, Jos Disappearing Peasantries? Rural Labour in Africa, Asia and Latin America (ed.) 2000. London: Intermediate Technology Publications
- Bryceson, Deborah Alcohol in Africa: Mixing Business, Pleasure and Politics (ed.) 2002. Portsmouth, NH: Heinemann
- Bryceson, Deborah & Banks, Leslie Livelihood, Linkages and Policy Paradoxes (ed.) 2001. Special Issue of the Journal of Contemporary African Studies 19(1)
- Bryceson, Deborah & Vuorela, Ulla The Transnational Family: New European Frontiers and Global Networks (ed.) 2002. Oxford: Berg Press
- Bryceson, Deborah & Potts, Deborah African Urban Economies: Viability, Vitality or Vitiation? (ed.) 2006. London: Palgrave Macmillan
- Bryceson, Deborah, Okely, Judith & Webber, Jonathan Identity and Networks: Fashioning Gender and Ethnicity across Cultures (ed.) 2007. Oxford: Berghahn
- Bryceson, Deborah, Havnevik, Kjell, Birgegård, Lars-Erik, Matondi, Prosper, Beyene, Atakilte African Agriculture and The World Bank: Development or Impoverishment? (ed.) 2007. Uppsala: Nordic Africa Institute ISBN 978-9171066084
- Bryceson, Deborah, Grieco, Margaret, Ndulo, Muna, Porter, Gina & McCray, Talia Africa, Transport and the Millenium Development Goals (ed.) 2009. Newcastle: Cambridge Scholars Publishing ISBN 978-1-4438-1300-6
- Bryceson, Deborah et al. How Africa Works: Occupational Change, Identity and Morality (ed.) 2010. London: Practical Action Publishers ISBN 978-1-85339-691-5
- Bryceson, Deborah & MacKinnon, Danny Mining & Urbanisation in Africa: Population, Settlement and Welfare Trajectories (ed.) 2012. Abingdon, UK: Routledge ISBN 9781138383289
- Bryceson, Deborah, Fisher, Eleanor, Jonsson, Jesper Bosse, Mwaipopo, Rosemarie Mining & Social Transformation in Africa: Mineralising and Democratising Trends in Artisanal Production (ed.) 2014. Abingdon, UK: Routledge ISBN 978-0-415-83370-7
- Bryceson, Deborah Transnational Families in Global Migration: Navigating Economic Development and Life Cycles across Blurred and Brittle Borders (ed.) 2019. Special Issue of the Journal of Ethnic and Migration Studies 45(16) doi:10.1080/1369183X.2018.1547017
- ‘Domestic Work’, in Bellucci, S. and A. Eckert (eds). 2019. General Labour History of Africa: Workers, Employers and Governments 20th-21st Centuries. Geneva, International Labour Office, 301–333. doi:10.2307/j.ctvd58sjm.18.
- 'Handbook of Transnational Families around the World'. (edited by Javiera Cienfuegos, Rosa Brandhorst and Deborah Fahy Bryceson) 2023. London: Springer/Taylor Francis. ISBN 978-3-031-15278-8.
