= Frederik David Holleman =

Dutch and South African academic, ethnologist, and jurist (1887–1958)

- Frederik David Holleman, during his tenure as a professor at Leiden University (1935-1939)
- Born: 11 May 1887; Potchefstroom, South African Republic
- Died: 22 January 1958 (aged 70); Stellenbosch, Union of South Africa
- Education: Leiden University
- Occupations: Professor, ethnologist, legal scholar

Frederik 'Frits' David Holleman (11 May 1887 – 22 January 1958) was a Dutch and South African academic, ethnologist, and jurist, best known for his research into the indigenous legal systems of the Dutch East Indies and South Africa.

== Biography ==
Frederik Holleman was born in Potchefstroom in the South African Republic (now a part of South Africa) in 1887 to a Dutch father and South African mother. His family later moved to the Netherlands, and he went to school in Kampen (1901–07) before studying law at Leiden University (1907–11).

He received his doctorate in law from Leiden University in 1911, where he was supervised by Cornelis van Vollenhoven, a professor and legal scholar best known for his work on the legal systems of the Dutch East Indies.

In 1912, Holleman completed the entrance exam for the Dutch Indies service and subsequently moved to the Dutch East Indies in the same year. Following in Van Vollenhoven's footsteps, Holleman developed an interest in adat law, the indigenous legal system used in the Dutch East Indies and beyond. By 1915 he was serving as president of the landsraad (colonial courts) of Tulungagung and Trenggalek. In this capacity, Holleman conducted research into the property, kinship, marriage, and inheritance laws of fifteen villages. During this time Holleman also contributed a chapter on Java in Van Vollenhoven's series Het Adatrecht van Nederlandsch-Indië.

In 1918, Holleman was transferred to Ambon where he acted in a similar capacity. He went on leave to Europe in 1922 during which time he published a book on the adat law of Ambon and nearby islands. He then returned to Ambon where he stayed until his appointment to the secretariat of the Governor-General in Java in 1924. In 1928, Holleman began to research property rights in Minahasa. At this time Holleman, along with fellow legal scholar Barend ter Haar, became one of the first vocal proponents of increased Dutch recognition of the indigenous legal systems of the Dutch East Indies, arguing that relying on indigenous legal systems was a cheaper and more effective means of dispute resolution.

In 1929, Holleman was appointed successor to Bep Schrieke at the law school in Batavia (now Jakarta) as an extraordinary professor in ethnology, and in 1930 he was appointed professor of ethnology and sociology, a post he held until 1934. During this time he taught adat law and also acted as chairperson of the faculty. In 1931, he was invited by the American Council of Learned Societies in Washington, D.C. to conduct research in adat law in the Philippines.

Shortly after the death of Van Vollenhoven in 1933, Holleman returned to the Netherlands. In 1935, he, along with Jaap Schrieke (brother of Bep Schrieke), was appointed as professor of adat law at Leiden University as Van Vollenhoven's successor.

Holleman remained in Leiden until he was appointed as an extraordinary professor in indigenous (Bantu) law and native administration at Stellenbosch University in South Africa in 1939.

At the request of the Dutch government, Holleman served in Melbourne, Australia, between May 1943 and May 1944, as director of emergency training of colonial administrators for the Dutch East Indies. For this service, he was awarded a knighthood in the Order of the Netherlands Lion in 1950.

Towards the end of his life, Holleman began to work on a project to codify the indigenous law of South Africa. In 1957, he was appointed honorary fellow at the University of Natal 'in recognition of his contribution to the science and teaching of the law systems of underdeveloped societies.'

Holleman died after several months of illness on 22 January 1958 in Stellenbosch. His son Johan Frederik Holleman continued his father's work in adat and Southern African indigenous law. The archives and photo collections of both Hollemans may be found in the special collections of Leiden University Library, Museum Volkenkunde, and the Afrika-Studiecentrum library, all in Leiden.
