= Nordic Studies on Alcohol and Drugs =

- Discipline: Addiction medicine
- Language: Danish, English, Norwegian, Swedish
- Edited by: Matilda Hellman

Publication details
- Former name: Alkoholpolitik – Tidskrift för nordisk alkoholforskning
- History: 1984–present
- Publisher: SAGE Publishing
- Frequency: Bimonthly
- Impact factor: 2.2 (2024)

Standard abbreviations
- ISO 4: Nord. Stud. Alcohol Drugs

Indexing
- CODEN: NANTFY
- ISSN: 1455-0725 (print); 1458-6126 (web)
- LCCN: 2017210580
- OCLC no.: 476330643

Links
- Journal homepage; Online access; Online archive

Nordic Studies on Alcohol and Drugs (Swedish: Nordisk alkohol- & narkotikatidskrift) is a bimonthly peer-reviewed open access medical journal covering research on the health effects of alcohol and other drugs. It was established in 1984 as Alkoholpolitik – Tidskrift för nordisk alkoholforskning (Swedish for Alcohol Policy – Journal for Nordic Alcohol Research). It was originally published as part of a partnership between the Nordic Council for Alcohol and Drug Research and the Finnish alcohol company Alko. It was previously published by Walter de Gruyter until being acquired by its current publisher, SAGE Publishing, in 2017. The editor-in-chief is Matilda Hellman (University of Helsinki). According to the Journal Citation Reports, the journal has a 2024 impact factor of 2.2.
