= Bonno Thoden van Velzen =

Dutch anthropologist (1933–2020)

- Born: Hendrik Ulbo Eric Thoden van Velzen; 5 April 1933; Vlissingen, Netherlands
- Died: 26 May 2020 (aged 87)
- Occupations: Anthropologist, writer

Hendrik Ulbo Eric "Bonno" Thoden van Velzen (5 April 1933 – 26 May 2020) was a Dutch anthropologist, Surinamist and Africanist.

== Life ==
Thoden van Velzen was born on 5 April 1933 in Vlissingen. His father was a coxswain in the merchant navy and teacher at the Rijksnormaalschool in the city of Deventer. His ancestors are Protestant pastors from the neighbourhood of Emden in East-Frisia, which is now part of the German federal state of Lower Saxony. In the Second World War he moved together with his parents and siblings to Utrecht because of the German Heer declaring the city of Vlissingen and its surrounds as Sperrgebiet. He finished his secondary school in the Indonesian city of Batavia (now Jakarta) and later in Vlissingen. After three years of military service, he began his study of sociology at the University of Amsterdam in 1955. During his study he met his life partner Ineke van Wetering, with whom he set off to Suriname for graduate studies of Maroon society after his first graduation. He has been in field for the first time from May 1961 to November 1962, studying the Ndyuka, the biggest group of the Maroons.

In 1966, he obtained his doctorate under professor A.J.F. Köbben with a thesis titled: "Politieke beheersing in de Djuka maatschappij. Een studie van een onvolledig machtsoverwicht". The same year he became employee of the Afrika-Studiecentrum Leiden, and he spent three years in Tanzania. In 1971, he became professor of cultural anthropology at Utrecht University, and succeeded the seventy-year-old professor Fischer. He wrote his last article about Tanzania in 1977, whereupon he dedicated his work to the Ndyuka society of Suriname. Thoden van Velzen left Utrecht University in 1991, when his position was lost in a reorganization. From 1991 until his retirement in 1999, Thoden van Velzen was professor at the Amsterdam School for Social Science Research. He was elected a member of the Royal Netherlands Academy of Arts and Sciences in 1990. Thoden van Velzen wrote his last article in cooperation with his wife Wilhelmina van Wetering. The book, called Een Zwarte Vrijstaat in Suriname was published in 2013. Near the end of his life, he was working on Prophets of Doom: A History of the Aukan Maroons which will be published by Brill Publishers.

He died on 26 May 2020.

== Bibliography ==
- Residence, Power and Intra-societal Aggression', in: International Archives of Ethnography 49, 1960, p. 169-200 [with W. van Wetering].
- Politieke beheersing in de Djuka maatschappij: een studie van een onvolledig machtsoverwicht. (Academical dissertation, Universiteit van Amsterdam, 1966).
- Land Scarcity and Rural Inequality in Tanzania: Some Cases from Rungwe District (with P.M. van Hekken). The Hague: Mouton, 1972.
- Antropologen op zoek naar de sterke man (Oratie), 1973.
- 'Robinson Crusoe and Friday: Strength and Weakness of the Big Man Paradigm', in: Man, Journal of the Royal Anthropological Institute 8, 1973: 592-612.
- 'On the Political Impact of a Prophetic Movement in Surinam', in: W.E.A. van Beek and J.H. Scherer (eds.), Explorations in the Anthropology of Religion; Essays in Honour of Jan van Baal. (Verhandelingen van het Koninklijk Instituut voor Taal-, Land en Volkenkunde 74). The Hague: Martinus Nijhoff, 1975, p. 215-233 [in cooperation with: W. van Wetering].
- 'Coalitions and Network Analysis', in: J. Boissevain & J.C. Mitchell (eds.), Network Analysis: Studies in Human Interaction. Den Haag: Mouton, 1973.
- 'Controllers in Rural Tanzania', in: David Parkin (ed.), Town and Country in Rural Tanzania. London: Oxford University Press, 1975, p. 178-189.
- 'Staff, Kulaks and Peasants', in: L. Cliffe, J.S. Coleman & M.R. Doornbos (eds.), Government and Rural Development in East Africa. The Hague: Martinus Nijhoff, 1977, p. 223-250.
- 'Bush Negro Regional Cults: A Materialist Explanation', in: R.P. Werbner (ed.), Regional Cults. London: Academic Press, 1977, p. 93-118.
- 'Bush Negro Prophetic Movements: Religions of Despair?', in: Bijdragen tot de Taal-, Land- en Volkenkunde 133, 1977, p. 100-135 (with Chris de Beet).
- 'The Origins of the Gaan Gadu Movement of the Bush Negroes of Surinam', in: Nieuwe West-Indische Gids 52, 1978, nr. 3/4, p. 81-130 (with W. van Wetering).
- 'Female Religious Responses to Male Prosperity in Turn-of-the-Century Bush Negro Societies', in: Nieuwe West-Indische Gids 56, 1982, p. 43-68 (with W. van Wetering)
- 'Voorspoed, angsten en demonen', in: Antropologische Verkenningen 1, 1982, p. 85-118.
- 'De Aukaanse (Djoeka) beschaving', in: Sociologische Gids 29, 1982, nr. 3-4, p. 243-278.
- 'Welvaarts- en armoedereligies in het Surinaamse binnenland', in: Glenn Willemsen (red.), Suriname: de schele onafhankelijkheid. Amsterdam: De Arbeiderspers, 1983, p. 37-74.
- 'Affluence, Deprivation and the Flowering of Bush Negro Religious Movements', in: Bijdragen tot de Taal-, Land- en Volkenkunde 139, 1983, p. 99-139 (with W. van Wetering).
- 'Voer voor antropologen'; inleiding tot Sigmund Freud, Totem en taboe, in: Sigmund Freud Nederlandse editie, reeks Cultuur en Religie dl. 4 (red. Paul Beers en Wilfred Oranje). Meppel/Amsterdam: Boom, 1984, p. 9-18.
- 'Irma at the Window: The Fourth Script of Freud's Specimen Dream', in: American Imago 41, nr. 3, 1984, p. 245-293.
- 'The Gaan Gadu Cult: Material Forces and the Social Production of Fantasy', in: Social Compass 32, nr. 1, 1985, p. 93-109.
- 'Herinneringen die rondspoken: het verleden in een Afro-Surinaamse samenleving', in: Sociologisch Tijdschrift 14, nr. 3, p. 407-436 (with W. van Wetering)
- 'Irma's Rape: The Hermeneutics of Structuralism and Psychoanalysis Compared', in: L.B. Boyer and S.A. Grolnick (eds.), The Psychoanalytic Study of Society 12, 1988, p. 1-36.
- The Great Father and the Danger: Religious Cults, Material Forces, and Collective Fantasies in the World of the Surinamese Maroons. Dordrecht: Foris Publications, 1988 (with W. van Wetering).
- 'Purity, a Greedy Ideology', in: Walter van Beek (ed.), The Quest for Purity. Amsterdam: Mouton De Gruyter 1988, p. 1-35 (with Walter E.A. van Beek).
- 'Puritan Movements in Suriname and Tanzania', in: idem, p. 217-245.
- 'Demonologie en de betovering van het moderne leven', in: Sociologische Gids 36, 1989, nr. 3/4, p. 155-186.
- 'Social Fetishism among the Surinamese Maroons, in: Etnofoor 3, nr.1, 1990, p. 77-95.
- 'Antropologie en droomtaal', in: Etnofoor 4, nr. 2, 1991, p. 21-41.
- 'Revenants that cannot be shaken: Collective Phantasies in a Maroon Society', in: American Anthropologist 97, nr.4, 1995, p. 722-732.
- 'Dangerous Ancestors: Ambivalent Visions of Eighteenth and Nineteenth Century Leaders of the Eastern Maroon of Suriname', in: Stephan Palmier (ed.), Slave Cultures and the Culture of Slavery, Knoxville: University of Tennessee Press, 1995, p. 112-144.
- 'Het ondergrondse leven: raakvlakken tussen psychoanalyse en antropologie', in: Joost Baneke en Roland Pierloot (eds.), Psychoanalyse en antropologie. Amsterdam: Thela Thesis, 1998.
- 'Dangerous Creatures and the Enchantment of Modern Life', in: P. Clough & J.P. Mitchell (eds.), Powers of Good and Evil: Moralities, Commodities and Popular Belief. New York/Oxford: Berghahn, 2001, p. 17-42 [with W. van Wetering].
- 'Ndyuka', in: Melvin Ember, Carol R. Ember, and Ian Skoggard (eds.), Encyclopedia of World Cultures, Supplement. New York: MacMillan Reference USA, 2002, p. 224-227 [with W. van Wetering].
- Een koloniaal drama. De grote staking van de Marron vrachtvaarders, 1923. Utrecht, 2003 [Bronnen voor de Studie van Suriname, deel 23].
- In the Shadow of the Oracle: Religion as Politics in a Suriname Maroon Society. Long Grove (Illinois): Waveland Press, 2004 [with W. van Wetering].
- 'De wijze raadslieden en de kapotmakers: een probleem met mondelinge overleveringen', in: Peter Meel en Hans Ramsoedh (eds.), Ik ben een haan met een kroon op mijn hoofd. Pacificatie en verzet in koloniaal en postkoloniaal Suriname. Amsterdam: Bert Bakker, 2007, p. 75-91.
- 'Violent Witch Finders and the Suspension of Social Order in a Suriname Maroon Society', in: Rob van Ginkel en Alex Starting (eds.), Wildness and Sensation: Anthropology of Sinister and Sensuous Realm. Apeldoorn/Antwerpen: Het Spinhuis, 2007, p. 157-176 [with W. van Wetering].
- 'Met een zwerver in debat: civilisatie en barbarij in staatloze samenlevingen', in: Annet Mooij, David Bos en Sonja van ’t Hof (eds.), Grenzeloos nieuwsgierig: opstellen voor en over Abram de Swaan. Amsterdam: Bert Bakker, 2007, p. 198-207.
- Een Zwarte Vrijstaat in Suriname. De Okaanse Samenleving in de 18e eeuw. Leiden: KITLV Uitgeverij, 2011 (with Wim Hoogbergen).
- Een Zwarte Vrijstaat in Suriname. De Okaanse Samenleving in de 19e en 20e eeuw. Leiden: E.J. Brill, 2013 (with W. van Wetering).
