= Hollmann =

Hollmann is a German surname. Notable people with the surname include:

- Birgit Hollmann (born 1973), German cyclist
- Friedrich von Hollmann (1842–1913), Admiral of the German Imperial Navy and Secretary of the German Imperial Naval Office
- Hans Hollmann (1899–1960), German electronic specialist who made several breakthroughs in the development of radar
- Mark Hollmann, American composer and lyricist
- Natty Hollmann (1939–2021), Argentine philanthropist and humanitarian
- Otakar Hollmann (1894–1967), Czech left-hand pianist
- Reiner Hollmann (born 1949), German former football player and now manager
- Silvia Hollmann (born 1955), retired West German hurdler
- Torge Hollmann (born 1982), German football player
