= Emile van Rouveroy van Nieuwaal =

Dutch filmmaker and academic (1939–2025)

- Born: 1 July 1939; Eindhoven, Netherlands
- Died: 4 December 2025 (aged 86); Genne, Netherlands
- Occupations: Film director, university teacher, anthropologist, Africanist
- Employer: Leiden University
- Spouse: Els A. Baerends
- Awards: Knight of the Order of Orange-Nassau (2015)

Emile Adriaan Benvenuto van Rouveroy van Nieuwaal (1 July 1939 – 4 December 2025) was a Dutch constitutional lawyer, legal anthropologist, Africanist, academic and documentary maker.

== Background ==
Van Rouveroy van Nieuwaal was born in Eindhoven on 1 July 1939. He died in Genne on 4 December 2025, at the age of 86.

== Career ==
=== Legal anthropologist ===
Van Rouveroy van Nieuwaal started as a researcher in folk law at the Africa Study Center in Leiden from 1967. In 1976, he received his doctorate from Leiden University with a thesis entitled Woman, monarch and justice of the peace: aspects of matrimonial law, traditional and modern folk law among the Anufòm in northern Togo (English translation of the original title in Dutch). From 1983 to 1988, he taught Constitutional History and Constitutional Law of Africa. In 1988, he was reappointed Extraordinary Professor of Law because of the Leiden University Fund. He held this chair until 2002.

=== Documentalist ===
Van Rouveroy van Nieuwaal made many documentaries on various subjects, including customary law in Togo, Staphorst, and the war history of his family.

Bonnet rouge, où vas-tu?
(2000)
A film on the socio-political role of the traditional leaders of the Mossi in Burkina Faso.

J'y crois
(2003)
A political documentary investigating the decentralization process in Mali.

Democratisch avontuur in Togo
(1992, only in Dutch)
