= Africa Yearbook =

- Discipline: Africa
- Language: English

Publication details
- Publisher: Brill Publishers (Netherlands)
- Frequency: annual

Standard abbreviations
- ISO 4: Afr. Yearb.

Indexing
- ISSN: 1871-2525 (print); 1872-9037 (web)

The Africa Yearbook (subtitle Politics, Economy and Society South of the Sahara) is a reference book published by the Arnold Bergstraesser Institute (ABI), which is compiled annually in co-operation between two editors from the ABI and from Botswana and Ghana at the Brill publishing house (Leiden).

== Scope ==
The yearbook covers major domestic political developments, the foreign policy and socio-economic trends in sub-Sahara Africa – all related to developments in one calendar year. The Africa Yearbook contains articles on all sub-Saharan states, each of the four sub-regions (West, Central, Eastern, Southern Africa) focusing on major cross-border developments and sub-regional organizations as well as one article on continental developments and one on European-African relations.

While the articles have thorough academic quality, the Yearbook is mainly oriented to the requirements of a large range of target groups: students, politicians, diplomats, administrators, journalists, teachers, practitioners in the field of development aid as well as business people.

It is the successor to the German-language Afrika Jahrbuch published by the Institut für Afrika-Kunde in Hamburg (today GIGA Institute for African Affairs), which issued its last yearbook in 2004 (on the year 2003). Originally, partners in Leiden and Uppsala were also involved. The Africa-Europe Group for Interdisciplinary Studies (AEGIS) was important for the new direction as an English-language and international reference organisation.

The Africa Yearbook received the Conover-Porter Award 2012 (best africana bibliography or reference work).

In 2024, the reference book celebrated its 20th anniversary; volume 20 covers the year 2023.

== See also ==
- Brill Publishers
