= Petrus Johannes Idenburg =

Dutch jurist

P. J. Idenburg
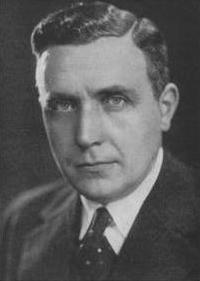
- Idenburg in the 1930s
- Born: Petrus Johannes Idenburg; 28 January 1898; Hillegersberg, Netherlands
- Died: 27 December 1989 (aged 91); The Hague, Netherlands

Academic work
- Discipline: Constitutional law, African studies, university administration, international diplomacy
- Institutions: Leiden University

Petrus Johannes Idenburg (28 January 1898, Hillegersberg, Netherlands – 27 December 1989, The Hague) was a jurist specialized in constitutional law, lector at Leiden University, and researcher on Africa.

He graduated in law in 1920 from the University of Amsterdam and continued his studies at the London School of Economics. Back in the Netherlands he became a secretary of the Mayor of Amsterdam in 1922 and secretary of (the board of the Curators of) the University of Amsterdam and later of the University of Leiden.

Idenburg was a board member of various Dutch-South African associations.

The idea of establishing a Dutch-Afrikaans law journal that would in 1936 become the Tydskrif vir Hedendaagse Romeins-Hollandse Reg (Journal of Contemporary Roman-Dutch Law) was borne with Idenburg in 1933, when he proposed the idea to the newly established Afrikaans law faculty at the University of Pretoria and later Stellenbosch University, in South Africa. Idenburg became a member of the journal's editorial board, along with professors Eduard Meijers, Julius Christiaan van Oven, LJ van Apeldoorn, J Donner, and the advocate FJ de Jong, who was the secretary of the board.

Due to his refusal to cooperate with the German occupation authorities to dismiss non-Arian university teachers, he resigned as a secretary of the Curators of Leiden University in June 1942. He was restored in 1945.

In 1947, he founded the Afrika-Studiecentrum, Leiden, which he led as a director from 1947 to 1963. From 1947 he taught African studies at Leiden University. From 1963 to 1968 he was a special lector for Constitutional Law of Africa.

He was a member of the Advisory Council for Development Cooperation for many years.

Peter Johannes was an elder brother of the statistician and director of Statistics Netherlands Prof. Dr. Philip Idenburg.

Idenburg's archives are kept by the Afrika-Studiecentrum in Leiden, while archives and photo albums from his many visits to Africa are kept by Museum Volkenkunde, also in Leiden.

== Selected works ==
- P.J. Idenburg: 'Political structural development in tropical Africa'. In: Orbis, a quarterly journal of world affairs, 1967, vol. 11, no. 1, p. 256-270
- P.J. Idenburg: The Cape of Good Hope at the turn of the eighteenth century. Leiden, Universitaire Pers, 1963.
- P.J. Idenburg: Ethnic and cultural pluralism in intertropical communities. Social aspect. Bruxelles, Imprimerie PUVREZ, 1957
- (in Dutch) Herinneringen van mr. P.J. Idenburg, [Den Haag], [1987]
