= Hulman =

Hulman can refer to:

- the Hulman family
- a fictitious Northern Indiana town, the setting for the movie a Christmas Story
