= Holliman =

Holliman is a surname. Notable people with the surname include:

- Earl Holliman (1928–2024), American actor
- Gerod Holliman (born 1994), American football player
- John Holliman (1948–1998), American journalist
- L. Hugh Holliman, American politician
- Shirlie Holliman (born 1962), English pop singer

== See also ==
- 6711 Holliman, a main-belt asteroid
