= Hileman =

Hileman may refer to:

- Hileman language, a nearly extinct Australian Aboriginal language
- A. F. Hileman (1851–1898), politician from North Carolina
- Scott Hileman (born 1972), American soccer goalkeeper
- T. J. Hileman (1882–1945), American photographer
