= Matilda Hellman =

Finnish sociologist (born 1974)

- Born: 1974 (age 51–52)

Academic background
- Education: Bachelor's degree in political science Master's degree in social sciences PhD in communication studies Docent in sociology
- Alma mater: University of Helsinki

Academic work
- Discipline: Sociology
- Sub-discipline: Addiction studies
- Institutions: Uppsala University; University of Helsinki; University of Tampere

Matilda Hellman (born 1974) is a Finnish sociologist and professor of sociology at Uppsala University, where she holds the Segerstedt Chair. She is editor-in-chief of Nordic Studies on Alcohol and Drugs. Her research examines the social, political, and cultural dimensions of addiction, lifestyles, the welfare state, and related policy.

== Education ==
In 2001, Hellman completed her Bachelor's degree in Political Science, earned a Master's degree in Social Sciences in 2002, and a Ph.D. in Communication in 2011. She was awarded the title Docent in Sociology in 2012, all from the University of Helsinki.

== Career ==
Hellman began her career in 2003 as a scientific editor for Nordisk alkohol- & narkotikatidskrift at the National Research and Development Centre for Welfare and Health (STAKES). She later moved into research roles, serving as a project leader at the Nordic Centre for Alcohol and Drug Research (NAD) and the Nordic Welfare Centre (NVC) from 2007 to 2011.

From 2011 to 2016, Hellman led the area "Ownership of addiction" in the EU Seventh Framework Programme (FP7) project ALICE RAP, which addressed addiction and lifestyles in Europe. The project produced several books on the research outcomes, including Hellman et al. (2016) Concepts of Addictive Substances and Behaviours Across Time and Place.

Hellman served as a lecturer in sociology at the University of Tampere from 2015 to 2017. In 2016, she was appointed research director at the Faculty of Social Sciences at the University of Helsinki, a position she held until 2023. She subsequently took up a full professorship in sociology at Uppsala University, where she holds the Segerstedt Chair, and remains affiliated with the University of Helsinki as an associate professor. In addition, she is the editor-in-chief of Nordic Studies on Alcohol and Drugs.

== Scientific contributions ==
Hellman has conducted research on gambling-related harms from a public health perspective, analyzed competing policy objectives, and studied how market structures influence consumption and harm. Her co-authored book Setting Limits: Gambling, Science and Public Policy was reviewed in Critical Gambling Studies, which described it as "a comprehensive review of research on worldwide gambling trends, addiction and related public health issues."

In a 2017 study, Hellman, Marjukka Monni, and Anna Alanko analyzed conceptions of the welfare state in Finnish government programmes between 1950 and 2015 and reported that, since 2014, the programmes' commitments to inclusion and universalism had been markedly reduced. Her work on online gaming has discussed the difficulty of properly defining video game addiction. She has also published on how addiction is framed in public discourse, including a 2015 study of press portrayals of "the addict".

Hellman is the lead author of Addiction and the Brain: Knowledge, Beliefs and Ethical Considerations from a Social Perspective (Springer, 2022), which examines the social and ethical implications of brain-based models of addiction. She is also a co-author of New Governance of Addictive Substances and Behaviours (Oxford University Press, 2017), the concluding volume of the EU-funded ALICE-RAP (Addictions and Lifestyles In Contemporary Europe – Reframing Addictions Project), which proposes a redesign of European addictions governance built around a "health footprint" accountability tool and a societal-well-being framework.
