= Zofia Helman =

Polish musicologist

Zofia Helman (born 8 March 1937) is a Polish musicologist and an honorary member of the Polish Composers' Union.

== Life ==
Zofia Helman was born in Radom and studied musicology at the University of Warsaw from 1954 to 1959. In 1967 she defended her doctoral dissertation on the sound techniques of Karol Szymanowski.

Helman took a position at the Institute of Musicology at the University of Warsaw in 1959, and served as director of the institute from 1991 to 1996. In 1991 she was appointed professor. She has also served as guest lecturer at the Department of Musicology at the Jagiellonian University, the Adam Mickiewicz University in Poznań, the Kraków Academy of Music, at the Hochschule für Musik Mainz at the University of Mainz, the University of Ljubljana, and the Geneva Conservatory in Beijing.

Helman has been a member of the Committee on Art, Academy of Sciences since 1981, and has sat on the Board of the Karol Szymanowski Foundation since 1996. She has served on the editorial boards of Polish Art Studies, Theatre, Opera, Ballet (Paris), Musicological Review and the PWM Music Encyclopedia. She is a member of musical and musicological associations including the International Musicological Society, the Robert-Schumann-Gesellschaft Düsseldorf, Gesellschaft für Musikforschung in Kassel, the Société Internationale d'Histoire Comparée du Théâtre de l'Opéra et du Ballet, the Polish Society of Composers, the Frédéric Chopin in Warsaw Music Society and the Karol Szymanowski Musical Society in Zakopane.

== Awards and honors ==
For her research work, Helman has been honored with the Golden Cross of Merit (1983), Award of the Ministry of Secondary Education (1986), Award of the Association of Polish Komozytorów (1988), Clio Award of the Department of History at the University of Warsaw (2000), the Karol Szymanowski Prize (2002), Annual Award of the Minister of Culture and National Heritage (2008) and an honorary membership in the Association of Polish Composers (2009).

== Books ==
Helman is the author of texts including:

- Neoclassicism in Polish music of the twentieth century, Kraków: PWM 1985
- Roman Palester: An Artist and His Work, London: Musica Iagellonica 1999
- Chopin letters (Vol. I, Warsaw 2010), co-author of new edition
