= Richard A. Hellman =

Richard A. Hellman (born April 24, 1940) is an American environmental consultant, attorney, and the President of the Middle East Research Center Limited (MERCL). He was named among the United Nations Environment Programme (UNEP) Global 500 Roll of Honour. Hellman is also President of the Friends of UNEP, USA.

== Early life and education ==
Hellman graduated from Canisius College in Buffalo, New York, with a bachelor's degree in history. He later received his Juris Doctor from Georgetown Law School in Washington, DC.

== Military service ==
Bronze Star

Hellman served in the Vietnam War, with distinction, having received the Bronze Star as a captain in Army counterintelligence.

== Public service ==
After leaving the army, Hellman began his career in government at the United States Environmental Protection Agency in 1966. He quickly rose in the agency and established its Office of Legislative Affairs. As the first Legislative Counsel of the Environmental Protection Agency, he created the Legislative Counsel's Office under William D. Ruckelshaus, EPA's first administrator, before going to work on Capitol Hill. As counsel to the US Senate Public Works Committee in 1972–76, he helped draft legislation on air and water quality, noise, solid wastes and toxic substances.

Hellman's desires for international roles began to be realized when Senator Howard Baker of Tennessee selected him to serve as executive director of the U.S. Committee for the Stockholm U.N. Conference on the Environment and then as U.S. advisor at the Conference, where the course of future international environmental action was set. Baker then named him Chief Minority Counsel of the Senate Committee on Environment and Public Works, where, as at EPA, he drafted landmark environmental laws, including those for clean air and water, waste recycling, toxic substances, oceans, mining and noise.

== Government of Israel ==
In 1976, Hellman was contracted by the Government of Israel as an environmental consultant. While in Israel, Hellman received support from the United Nations to draft Israel's environmental laws and plans. Upon completion of this project, he was named by Israel to be the Chief Environmental Advisor on the District Planning and Building Commission for the rebuilding and restoration of Jerusalem. In this role, he led delegations to the Rome and Venice U.N. Mediterranean conferences.

== Environmental activism ==
Hellman is a member of the bar association in Washington DC, with an application pending in New York.

In Washington, Hellman's law practice involves environmental, and corporate matters. He also founded and now chairs the U.S. Committee for the U.N. Environment Programme (UNEP). Hellman is called on to testify, write and speak on subjects related to the environment, water, and sustainable development.

Hellman was an official advisor to the 1992 UN Earth Summit and 1994 UN International Conference on Population and Development. He has served as a consultant to the U.S. State Department and the United Nations Environment Program (UNEP), among others.
