= Hellmann =

Hellmann is a German surname. Notable people with the surname include:

- Claudia Hellmann (1923–2017), German contralto
- Diethard Hellmann (1928–1999), German choral conductor and academic
- Ernesto Hellmann (1898–1952), Italian chess player
- Gustav Hellmann (1854–1939), German meteorologist
- Hans Hellmann (1903–1938), German theoretical chemist
  - Hellmann–Feynman theorem
- Libby Fischer Hellmann (born 1949), crime fiction writer
- Martina Hellmann (born 1960), German athlete
- Richard Hellmann (1876–1971), German-American businessman and founder of Hellmann's

== See also ==
- Hellman
- Hellmann Worldwide Logistics
- Hellmann's and Best Foods
- Helman
- Helmand Province, Afghanistan
