= Herta Mohr =

Austrian Egyptologist, later of the Netherlands

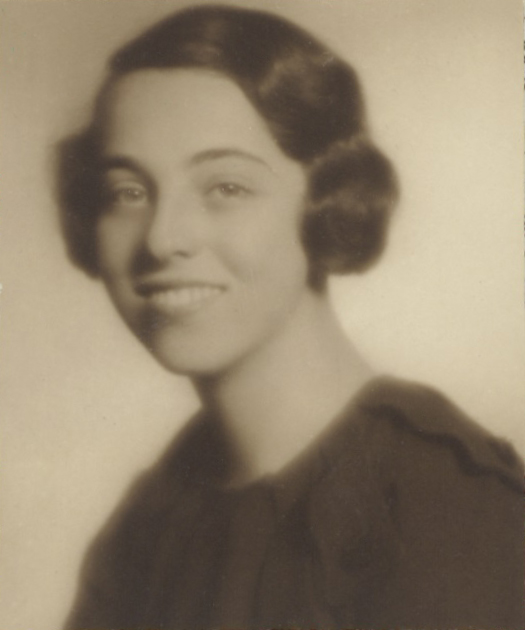
- Herta Theresa Mohr, 1937
- Born: 24 April 1914; Vienna
- Died: 15 April 1945 (aged 30); Bergen-Belsen, Nazi Germany
- Cause of death: Holocaust victim
- Education: Realgymnasium Wien XIV
- Alma mater: University of Vienna, Leiden University
- Scientific career
- Fields: Egyptology
- Academic advisors: Adriaan de Buck

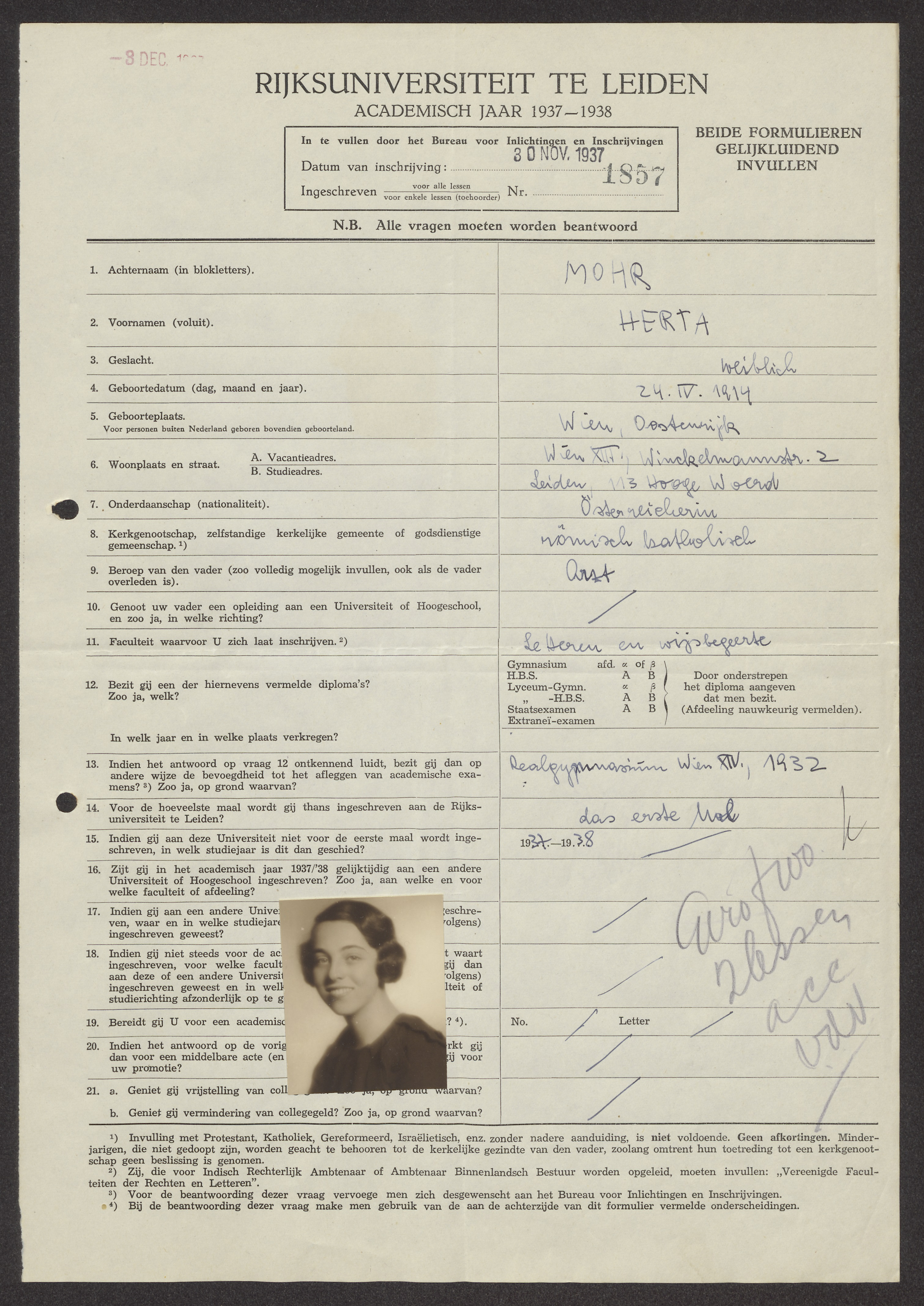
Registration of Herta Mohr as an Arts and Philosophy student, Leiden University, 30 November 1937.

Herta Theresa Mohr (Vienna, 24 April 1914 – Bergen-Belsen, 15 April 1945) was an Austrian-born Jewish Egyptologist who lived in the Netherlands. She published on the mastaba chapel of Hetepherakhty in the National Museum of Antiquities in Leiden, the Netherlands, and died a Holocaust victim.

== Life, education, and work ==
=== Vienna, 1914-1937 ===
Herta Mohr was born in Vienna, Austria, the only child of Adolf Israel Mohr and Gabriele Kaufmann. Her father was a doctor who served in field hospitals during the First World War; he received a Golden Cross of Merit for this. Mohr first enrolled as a medical student at Vienna University but switched to Oriental Studies. In 1937–1938 she followed classes on Egyptology and African languages taught by Wilhelm Czermak (1889-1953) and Heinrich Balcz (1898-1944).

=== Leiden, 1937-1942 ===
Mohr and her parents moved to Leiden, the Netherlands, where she enrolled at Leiden University on 30 November 1937.

In September 1938 she gave a lecture on the tomb chapel of Hetepherakhty, an ancient Egyptian monument dating to the Old Kingdom, at the 20th International Congress of Orientalists in Brussels, titled 'Einige Bemerkungen zur Leidener Mastaba', illustrated with lantern slides.

Baptised a Catholic on 13 July 1939, she joined the Leiden Roman-Catholic Students' Association "Augustinus". Although she had a travel permit for the United States, she was ultimately unable to use it. In 1940, when the Nazi occupying force in the Netherlands forced all non-Dutch inhabitants to move out of the coastal zone, she moved to Eindhoven, while her parents moved to 's-Hertogenbosch. Mohr continued preparations for her treatise on the tomb chapel of Hetepherakhty. The volume appeared in 1943, published by the Dutch Oriental Society "Ex Oriente Lux", which she had joined while living in Leiden.

=== Arrest and decease, 1942-1944 ===
On 2 August 1942 the Mohr family was among the Catholic Jews who were arrested and transported to Westerbork transit camp as retaliation for a protest from the Catholic Church against the persecution of Jews. Mohr worked as a translator in Westerbork and her further transport to a concentration camp was temporarily postponed (Sperre) for this reason. After an incident in January 1944 she was put on transport to Auschwitz concentration camp as punishment. Adolf and Gabriele Mohr were put on transport to Theresienstadt around the same time. They were sent from Theresienstadt to Auschwitz at the end of October 1944, and were killed directly after they arrived there.

In January 1945, when Auschwitz was evacuated before the arrival of Russian forces, Mohr must have been sent with other prisoners to Gross-Rosen concentration camp; an eyewitness saw her in the hospital there. Gross-Rosen was also evacuated before its liberation in February 1945; prisoners were sent to other concentration camps in Germany. The location and date of Herta Mohr's death cannot be verified; they must later have been legally established by a judge. According to official records Herta Mohr died in Bergen-Belsen on 15 April 1945, the date of the liberation and thus the end of this concentration camp.

== Gallery ==
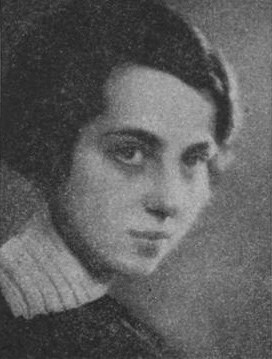
Mohr portrait from Arnolds: Gedenkboek etc., 1947.

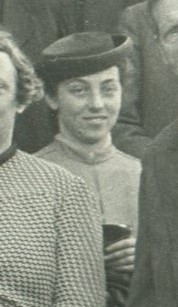
Mohr in a group of colleagues, unknown date.

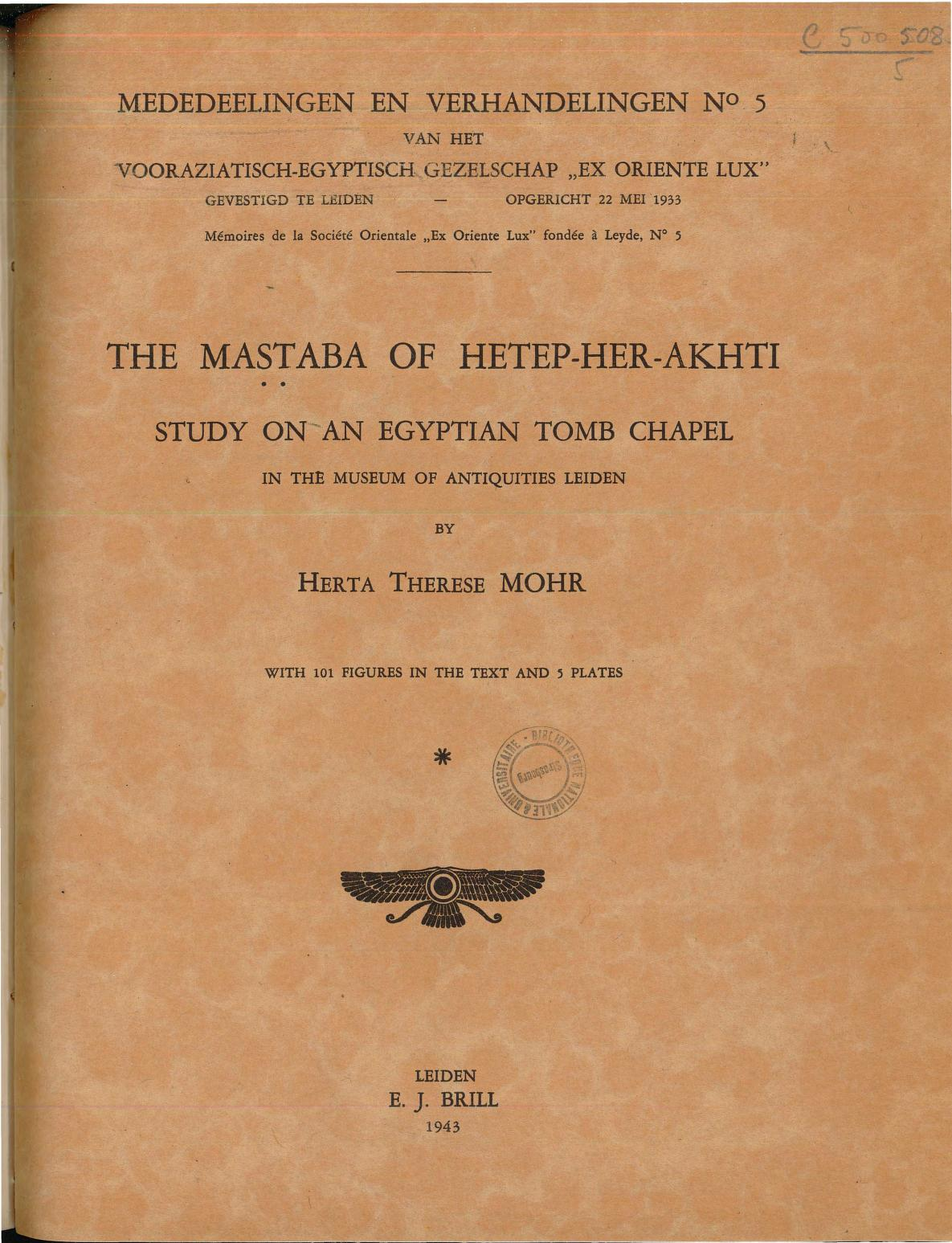
Herta Therese Mohr: The Mastaba of Hetep-her-Akhti. Study on an Egyptian tomb chapel in the Museum of Antiquities, Leiden, 1943

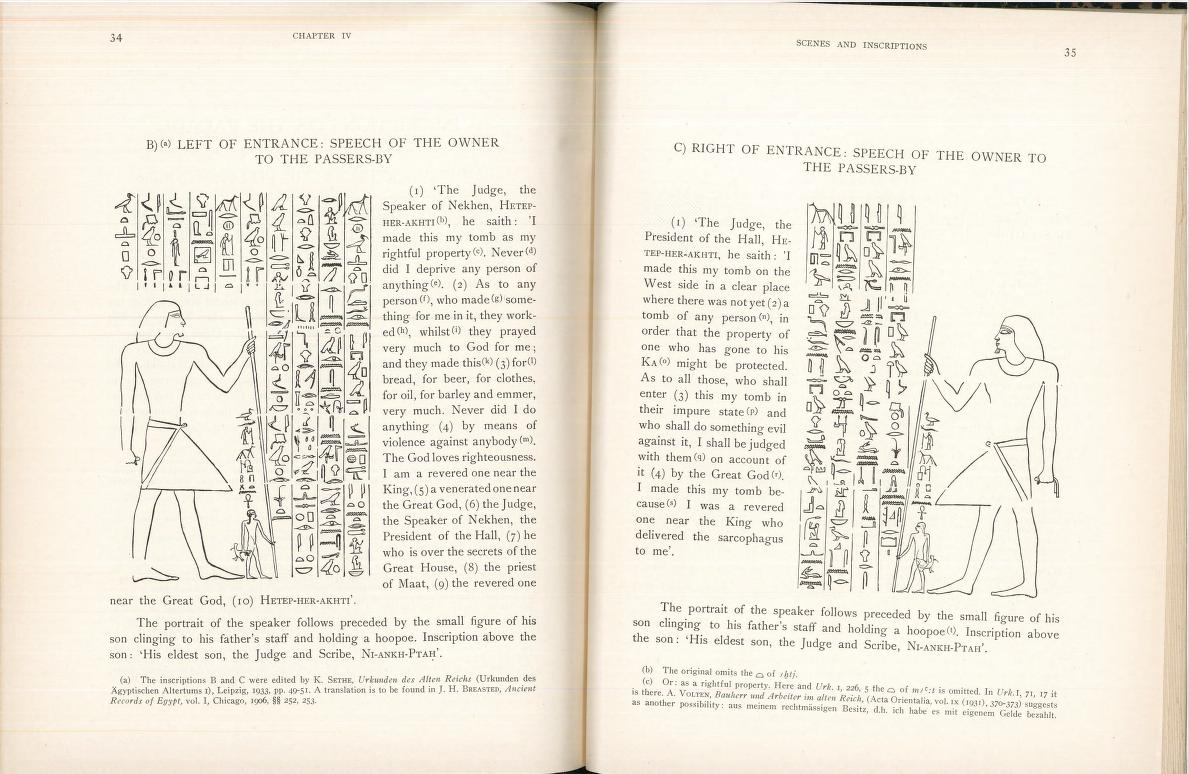
Herta Therese Mohr: The Mastaba of Hetep-her-Akhti, 1943, pp. 34-35.
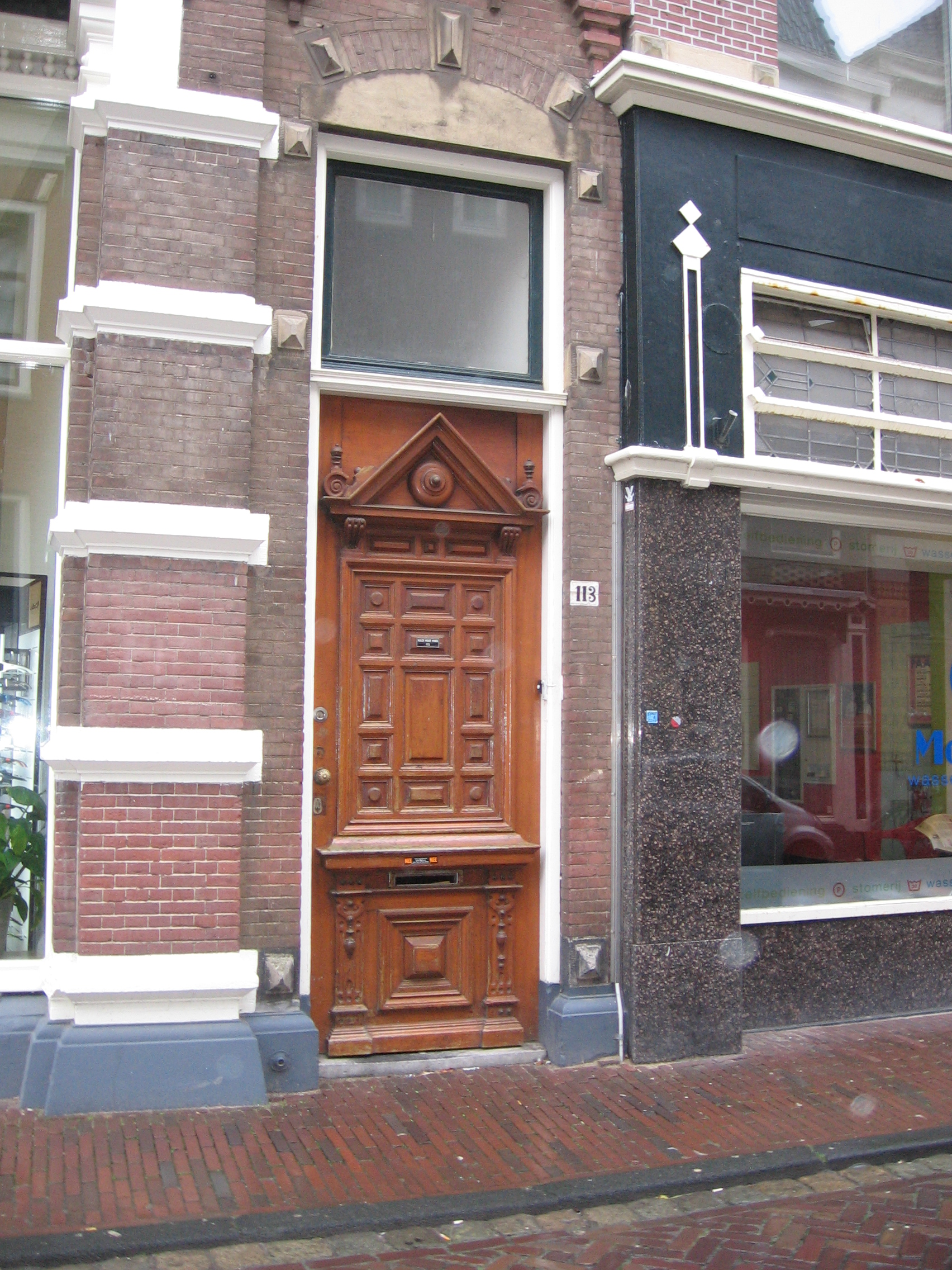
Herta Mohr's student house, Hogewoerd 113, Leiden, 2024.

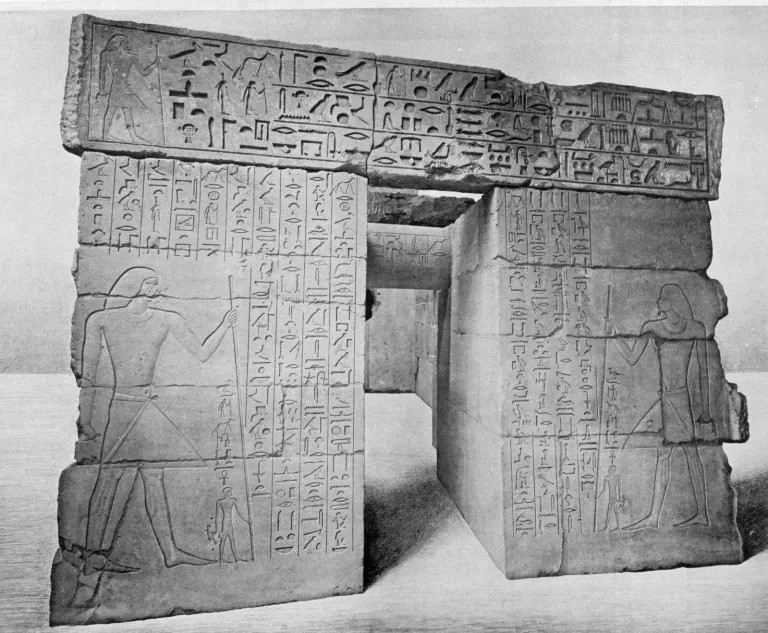
Egyptian offering chapel of Hetepherakhty (Hetepherachty), National Museum of Antiquities, Leiden, 1905

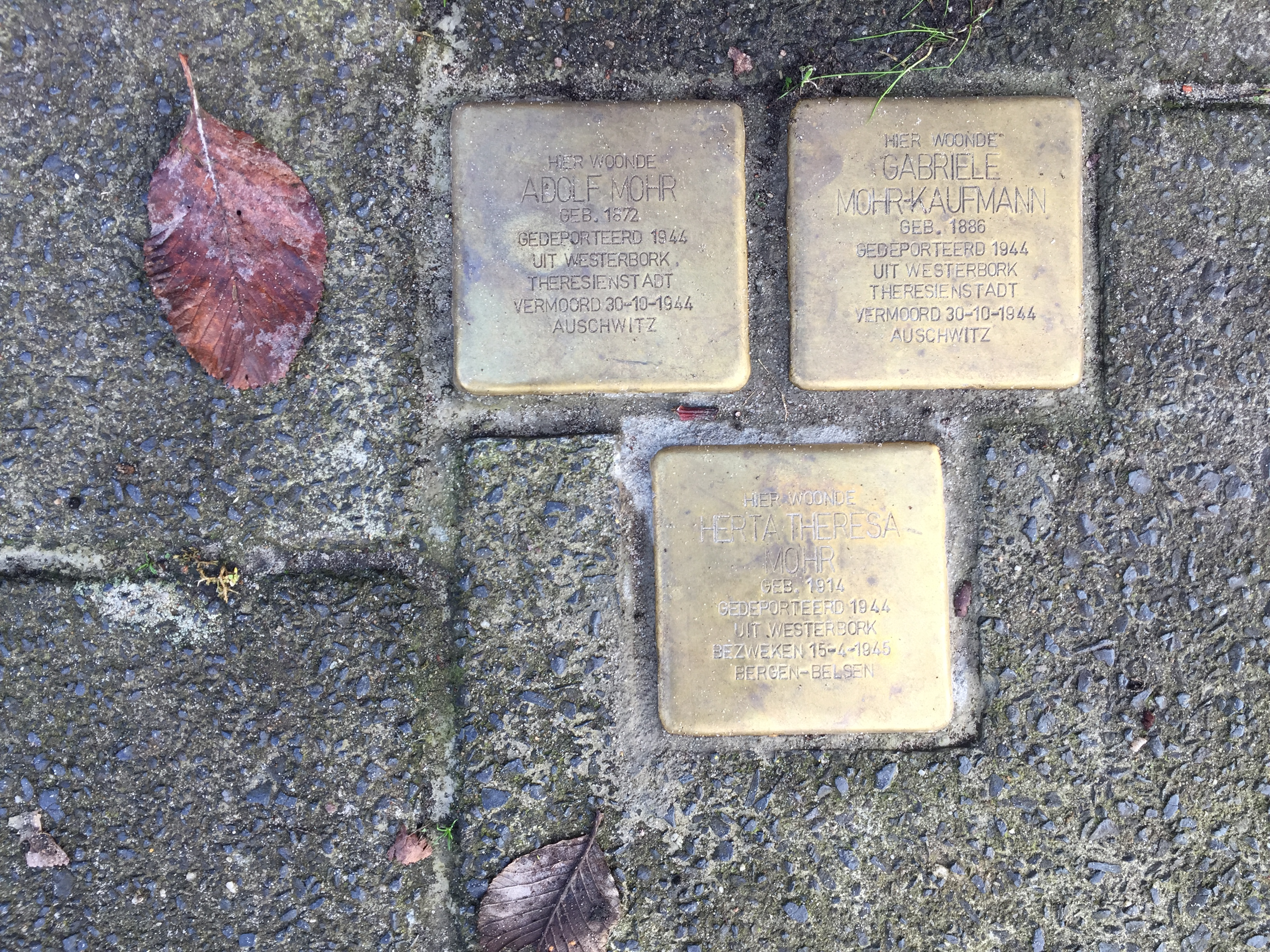
Stolpersteine in Leiden for Adolf Mohr (1872-1944), Gabriele Mohr-Kaufmann (1886-1944) en Herta Mohr (1914-1945)

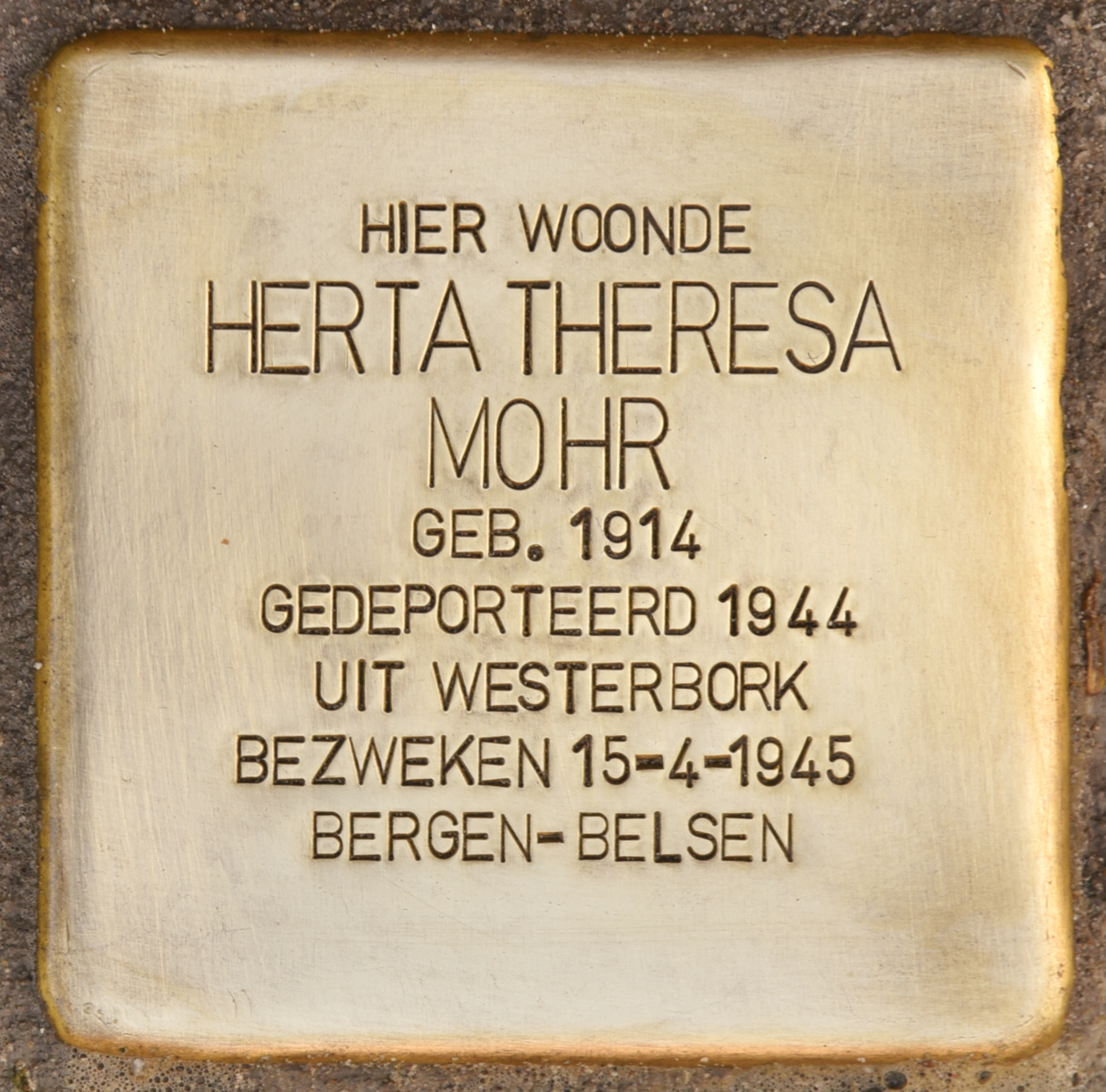
Detail: Stolperstein in Leiden for Herta Theresa Mohr.

== Publications ==
- Herta Mohr (1940). "Einige Bemerkungen zur Leidener Mastaba". Actes du XXe Congrès international des orientalistes, Bruxelles, 5–10 septembre 1938 [Some remarks on the Leiden Mastaba] (in German). Leuven: Bureaux du Muséon. OCLC 750881985.
- Mohr, H.Th. (1940). "Een vechtpartij te Leiden: Vorm en inhoud van een reliëf in de mastaba van Ḥtp-ḥr-Ꜣḫtj" [A fight in Leiden: Form and content of a relief in the mastaba of Ḥtp-ḥr-Ꜣḫtj]. Jaarbericht Ex Oriente Lux. 7: 535–541, pl. IX. OCLC 604997354.
- Mohr, H.Th. (1943). The Mastaba of Hetep-Her-Akhti. Study on an Egyptian Tomb Chapel in the Museum of Antiquities Leiden. Mededeelingen en Verhandelingen van het Vooraziatisch-Egyptisch Gezelschap "Ex Oriente Lux". Vol. 5. Leiden: E.J. Brill. OCLC 804912269.

== Commemorations ==
Stolpersteine for Adolf, Gabriele, and Herta Mohr have been placed in Leiden in the pavement in front of their house at Fagelstraat 17. The family lived at this address in the late 1930s and the early 1940s. Stolpersteine for Adolf and Gabriele Mohr have also been placed at Kasterenwal in 's-Hertogenbosch – the house at Tweede Kasterenstraat 1, where they lived, no longer stands. The names of all three family members are inscribed on the Jewish Monument in 's-Hertogenbosch.

In February 2024, Leiden University's Faculty of Humanities announced that a newly renovated building was named after Herta Mohr.
