= Cornelis van Vollenhoven =

Dutch legal scholar (1874–1933)

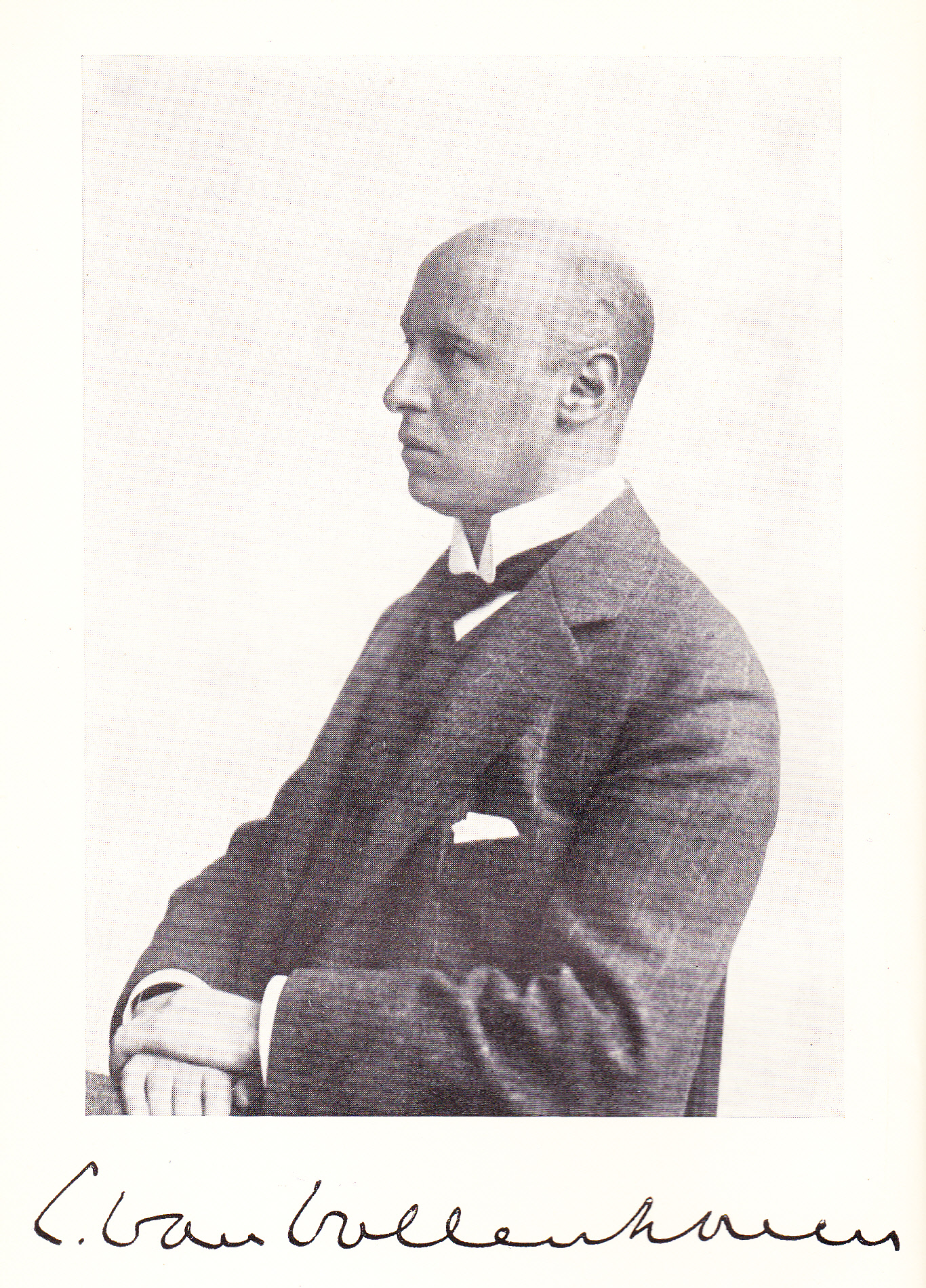
Cornelis van Vollenhoven in 1917

Cornelis van Vollenhoven (8 May 1874, Dordrecht – 29 April 1933, Leiden) was a Dutch law professor and legal scholar, best known for his work on the legal systems of the East Indies.

Cornelis van Vollenhoven began his university studies at Leiden at the age of 17, where he would earn many degrees, including a master's in law (1895), a bachelor's degree in Semitic languages (1896), a master's in political science (1897), and finally his Ph.D. in law and political science (1898). He received a cum laude for his thesis, “Scope and content of international law” (Omtrek en inhoud van het internationale recht), which foreshadows his later focus on the laws of Southeast Asia.

After finishing his studies, Van Vollenhoven became the private secretary of J.Th. Cremer, a colonial captain of industry and minister of Colonial Affairs. In 1901 Van Vollenhoven became a professor of the Adat Law of the Dutch East Indies at Leiden University. As a legal scholar, he had an enormous influence on his students and colleagues. Several of his students would go on to become prominent scholars in the field of Adat law, including Frederik David Holleman, whose doctorate was supervised by Van Vollenhoven. The University of Amsterdam granted him an honorary doctorate in 1932.

For most of his life, Van Vollenhoven focused on the traditional legal system of Indonesia, the Adat. He campaigned for its preservation and dispelled myths of its being quackery and inefficient. He wrote numerous pamphlets on the subject, including "The Adat-law of the Netherlands-Indies” (Het adatrecht van Nederlandsch-Indië), which documented the adat traditions of 19 different regions, plus the adat traditions of the Foreign Orientals (vreemde oosterlingen, i.e. Arabs, Chinese, Indians, and the like). Most remarkably, all of his work was done in Leiden, as Van Vollenhoven visited the East Indies only twice—once in 1907 and again in 1923. During his life, he was Adat's greatest champion and is still revered by many of the older generations in Indonesia. “The Man for Adat Law”, as he was called, died in Leiden in 1933.

The Van Vollenhoven Institute for Law, Governance, and Society, part of the Leiden Law School, is named after Cornelis van Vollenhoven.
