= Helman =

Helman is a surname. Notable people with the surname include:

- Abel Helman (1824–1910), American pioneer of Ashland, Oregon
- Albert Helman, pseudonym of politician, playwright and poet Lou Lichtveld
- Abraham Helman (1907–1952), Canadian chess master
- Harry Helman (1894–1971), Canadian ice hockey player
- Josh Helman (born 1986), Australian actor
- Michael Helman (born 1996), American baseball player
- Nathaniel T. Helman (1905–1993), New York politician and judge
- Pablo Helman (born 1959), Argentine visual effects artist
- Reuven Helman (1927–2013), Israeli weightlifter
- Scott Helman (born 1995), Canadian singer-songwriter
- Zeydl Shmuel-Yehuda Helman (c. 1855–c. 1938), Romanian songwriter and journalist
- Zofia Helman (born 1937), Polish musicologist

== See also ==
- Helman Glacier, a tributary glacier in the Admiralty Mountains of Antarctica
- Helman Tor, a tor in mid Cornwall, England
- Hellman
- Hellmann
