= Samuel Brown (engineer) =

English engineer and inventor

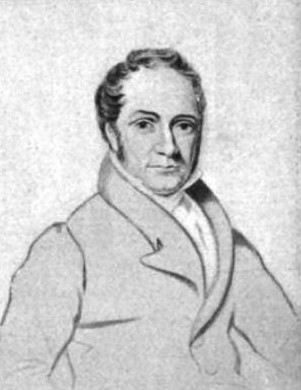
Samuel Brown

Samuel Brown (1799 – 16 September 1849) was an English engineer and inventor credited with developing one of the earliest examples of an internal combustion engine, during the early 19th century.

Brown, a cooper by training (he also patented improvements to machinery for manufacturing casks and other vessels), has been described as the 'father of the gas engine'. While living at Eagle Lodge in the Brompton area of west London, from 1825 to 1835, he developed 'the first gas engine that unquestionably did actual work and was a mechanical success'. He set up two engines for demonstration purposes in the grounds of the Lodge.

His obituary credited him with being the inventor of the gas vacuum engine and the screw propeller.

== Brown's Gas Vacuum Engines ==
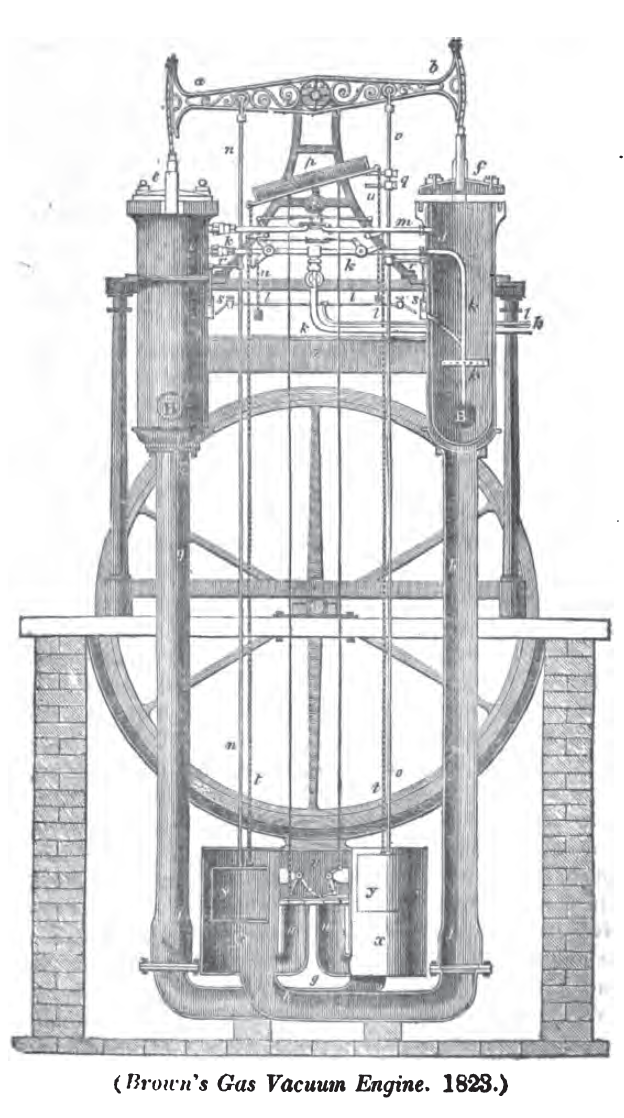
Brown's Gas Vacuum Engine 1823

In patents dated 4 December 1823 and 22 April 1826, Brown proposed to fill a closed chamber with a gas flame, and so expel the air; then he condensed the flame by injecting water, and operated an air engine by exhausting into the partial vacuum so obtained. The idea was evidently suggested by James Watt's condensing steam engine, flame being employed instead of steam to obtain a vacuum.

Brown later designed an engine that used hydrogen as a fuel—an early example of an internal combustion engine. It was based on an old Newcomen engine, had a separate combustion and working cylinders, and was cooled by water contained within a casing or cylinder lining, circulated around the cylinders (water was constantly kept moving through the action of a pump and was recooled by contact with outside air). It had a capacity of 8,800 cc but was rated at only 4 hp. He tested the engine by using it to propel a vehicle up Shooter's Hill on 27 May 1826.

"In 1826, Mr. Samuel Brown applied his gas-vacuum engine ... to a carriage, and ascended Shooter's hill to the satisfaction of numerous spectators. The great expense, however, which attended the working of a gas-vacuum engine, prevented its adoption."

In 1828 the vacuum engine propelled carriage was again exhibited, this time running along the Hammersmith Road with several gentlemen in or upon it and a speed of 7 miles per hour.

On 1 February 1827 Brown demonstrated the ability of a version of his gas vacuum engine to power a river boat on the Thames (this followed an unsuccessful trial in January 1827). It was installed in a 36 foot cutter of a type common on the Thames and drove two paddle wheels. Its speed was claimed at 7-8 mph (6 knots). The gas used was water gas, i.e. the mixture of hydrogen and carbon monoxide obtained by passing water over white hot coke. The benefit of using water gas generated from steam rather than the steam itself was said to be a factor of 30, plus the weight of the engine was said to be 600 pounds compared to 2 to 3 tons for an equivalent steam engine. This experiment had been funded by the Canal Gas Engine Company, who met the same day and after discussing the experiments in spite of acknowledging the success of the trial decided to wind up the company rather than raise further funds.

In 1832 Brown demonstrated three of his engines of different types and construction at his premises at Eagle Lodge, Old Brompton. All three engines were in operation and one was of the same type as had been operating successfully on the Croydon Canal raising water from a lower to a higher level since June 1830. The economics of the Croydon Canal engine were interesting as the gas it consumed was made by turning coal into coke. The value of the resulting coke and coal tar by-products of making the gas substantially exceeded the cost of the coal, ground rent, repairs etc, so the gas vacuum engine made a profit of over £100 a year before considering the useful work it was doing. Unfortunately the economics of the Croydon Canal were not so robust and it closed in 1836. The gas vacuum engine complete with gasometer in situ on Croydon Common was auctioned as a going concern in 1837. It was described as able to lift water a height of 11 feet at a rate of 2000 gallons per minute.

The reports of an 1834 court case reveal that Brown and Company had been contracted to build a large gas vacuum engine to pump the fens at Soham. This engine had been designed to pump 7805 gallons of water per minute, lifting water 14 feet at 14 strokes per minute. It fell short of specification and only delivered two thirds of its rated horsepower, with a lift of 10 feet 6 inches.

The gas vacuum engine was eventually to become a commercial success. In 1853–1854 Eugenio Barsanti and Felice Matteucci invented and patented the Barsanti–Matteucci engine which was a different form of gas vacuum engine. Developed further by Otto & Langen in Germany, it was put into worldwide production (outside Germany) by Crossley of Manchester between 1867 and 1877. Examples of this form of engine can be seen working at the Anson Engine Museum. This success arose from a demonstration of the engine at the World Fair in Paris in 1867, where it was shown to be far more efficient than the current production gas engine of Lenoir which was driven by the pressure resulting from burning the gas, rather than a vacuum. The success of the vacuum engine was however short lived after the creation of engines that compressed the gas/air mixture before igniting it.

== See also ==
- Timeline of hydrogen technologies
- History of the internal combustion engine
