= History of the internal combustion engine =

Various scientists and engineers contributed to the development of internal combustion engines. Following the first commercial steam engine (a type of external combustion engine) by Thomas Savery in 1698, various efforts were made during the 18th century to develop equivalent internal combustion engines. In 1791, the English inventor John Barber patented a gas turbine. In 1794, Thomas Mead patented a gas engine. Also in 1794, Robert Street patented an internal-combustion engine, which was also the first to use liquid fuel (petroleum) and built an engine around that time. In 1798, John Stevens designed the first American internal combustion engine. In 1807, French engineers Nicéphore and Claude Niépce ran a prototype internal combustion engine, using controlled dust explosions, the Pyréolophore. This engine powered a boat on the river in France. The same year, the Swiss engineer François Isaac de Rivaz built and patented a hydrogen and oxygen-powered internal-combustion engine. Fitted to a crude four-wheeled wagon, François Isaac de Rivaz first drove it 100 metres in 1813, thus making history as the first car-like vehicle known to have been powered by an internal-combustion engine.

Samuel Brown patented the first internal combustion engine to be applied industrially in the United States in 1823. Brown also demonstrated a boat using his engine on the Thames in 1827, and an engine-driven carriage in 1828. Father Eugenio Barsanti, an Italian engineer, together with Felice Matteucci of Florence invented the first real internal combustion engine in 1853. Their patent request was granted in London on 12 June 1854, and published in London's Morning Journal under the title "Specification of Eugene Barsanti and Felix Matteucci, Obtaining Motive Power by the Explosion of Gasses". In 1860, Belgian Jean Joseph Etienne Lenoir produced a gas-fired internal combustion engine. In 1864, Nicolaus Otto patented the first commercially successful gas engine.

George Brayton invented the first commercial liquid-fueled internal combustion engine in 1872. In 1876, Nicolaus Otto, working with Gottlieb Daimler and Wilhelm Maybach, patented the compressed charge, four-stroke cycle engine. In 1879, Karl Benz patented a reliable two-stroke gas engine. In 1892, Rudolf Diesel developed the first compressed charge, compression ignition engine. In 1954 German engineer Felix Wankel patented a "pistonless" engine using an eccentric rotary design.

The first liquid-fuelled rocket was launched in 1926 by Robert Goddard. The Heinkel He 178 became the world's first jet aircraft by 1939, followed by the first ramjet engine in 1949 and the first scramjet engine in 2004.

== Prior to 1850 ==
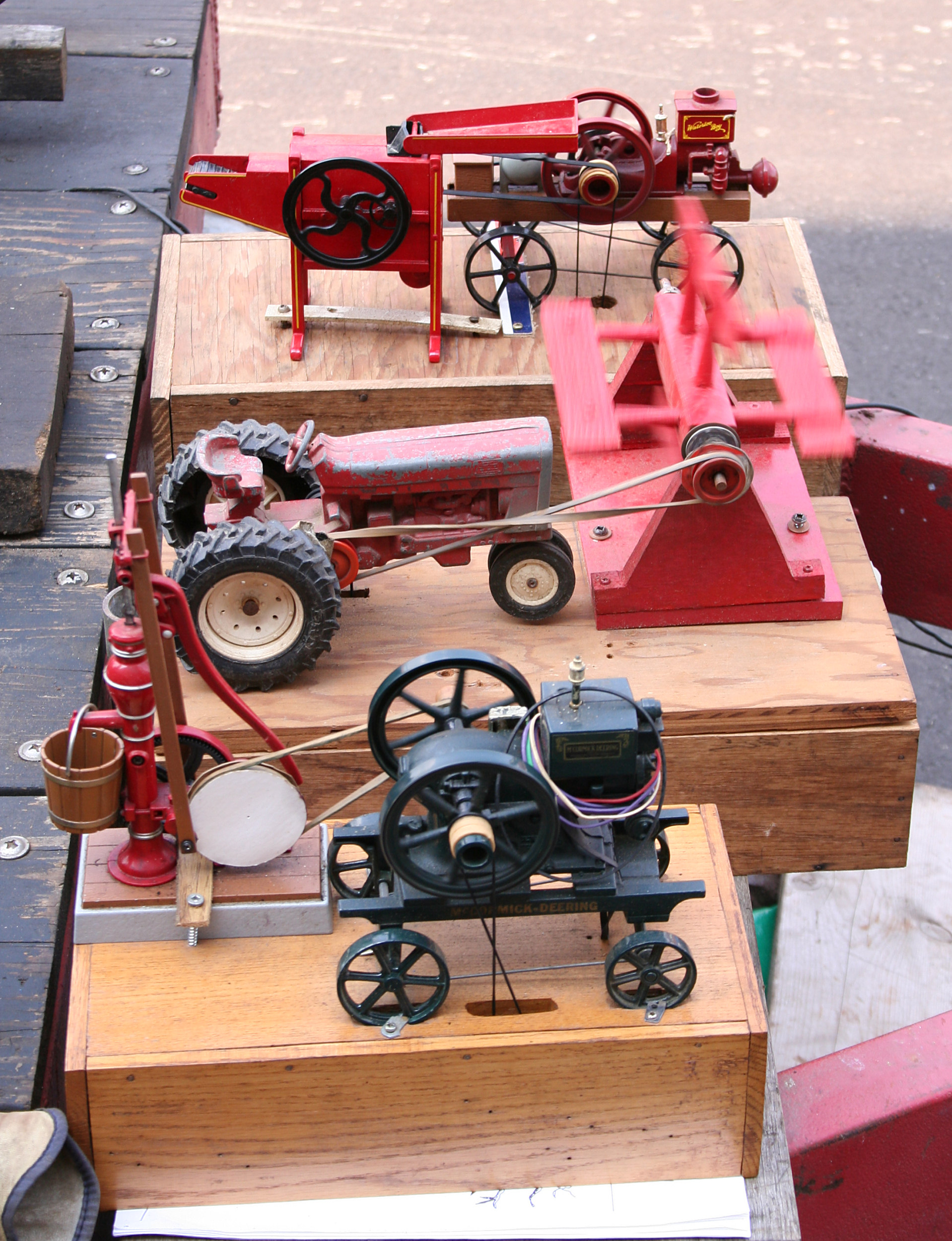
Types of farm equipment typically powered by early engines (scale models)

- Before 100 AD: The fire piston is invented in Southeast Asia, and its use is concentrated in Austronesia. This device and the aforementioned Diesel's experiences with pneumatic pumps, inspired the Diesel engine, which also uses compression ignition (as opposed to spark ignition).
- Sometime between the 10th and 13th centuries (dating uncertain): The fire arrow, a gunpowder-fuelled form of rocket engine, is invented in China.
- 1678–1679: The Huygens' engine, a prototype single-cylinder gunpowder engine is built by Dutch inventor Christiaan Huygens.
- 1745 : Abbot Agostino Ruffo of Verona testing a pump for leaks noticed that, after pressurization the wood plug had been scorched. Later he made an apparatus to further study timber ignition by pumps.
- 1780s: An "electric pistol", which used an electric spark to ignite hydrogen gas in an enclosed vessel, is invented by Italian chemist Alessandro Volta. This is possibly the first example of a spark-ignition heat engine.
- 1791: The principle for a gas turbine engine is described in the patent A Method for Rising Inflammable Air for the Purposes of Producing Motion and Facilitating Metallurgical Operations by British inventor John Barber.
- 1794: A reciprocating piston engine is built by Robert Street. This engine was fuelled by gas vapours, used the piston's intake stroke to draw in outside air, and the air/fuel mixture was ignited by an external flame. Another gas engine was also patented in 1794 by Thomas Mead.
- 1801: The concept of using compression in a two-stroke gas engine was theorised by French engineer Philippe LeBon D’Humberstein.
- 1807: One of the first known working internal combustion engines – called the Pyréolophore – is built by French inventors Claude Niépce and Nicéphore Niépce. This single prototype engine used a series of controlled dust explosions and was used to power a boat upstream in the river Saône in France.
- 1807: The hydrogen-fuelled De Rivaz engine is built by Swiss engineer François Isaac de Rivaz and fitted to a wheeled carriage, possibly creating the first known automobile. This prototype engine used spark-ignition (as per the 1780s Alessandro Volta design above).
- 1823: The concept of a gas vacuum engine is patented by British engineer Samuel Brown. One of Brown's engines was used to pump water at a canal in London from 1830 to 1836.
- 1824: The Carnot cycle – a thermodynamic theory for heat engines – is published in a research paper by French physicist Nicolas Léonard Sadi Carnot.
- 1826: A patent for the principle of a "gas or vapor engine" is granted to American inventor Samuel Morey. The patent includes the first known design for a carburetor.
- 1833: A patent for a double-acting gas Lemuel Wellman Wright, UK patent no. 6525, table-type gas engine. Double-acting gas engine, first record of water-jacketed cylinder.
- 1838: A patent for the principle of a double-acting gas engine is granted to British inventor William Barnett. This is the first known design to propose in-cylinder compression and the use of a water jacket for cooling.

== 1850–1879 ==
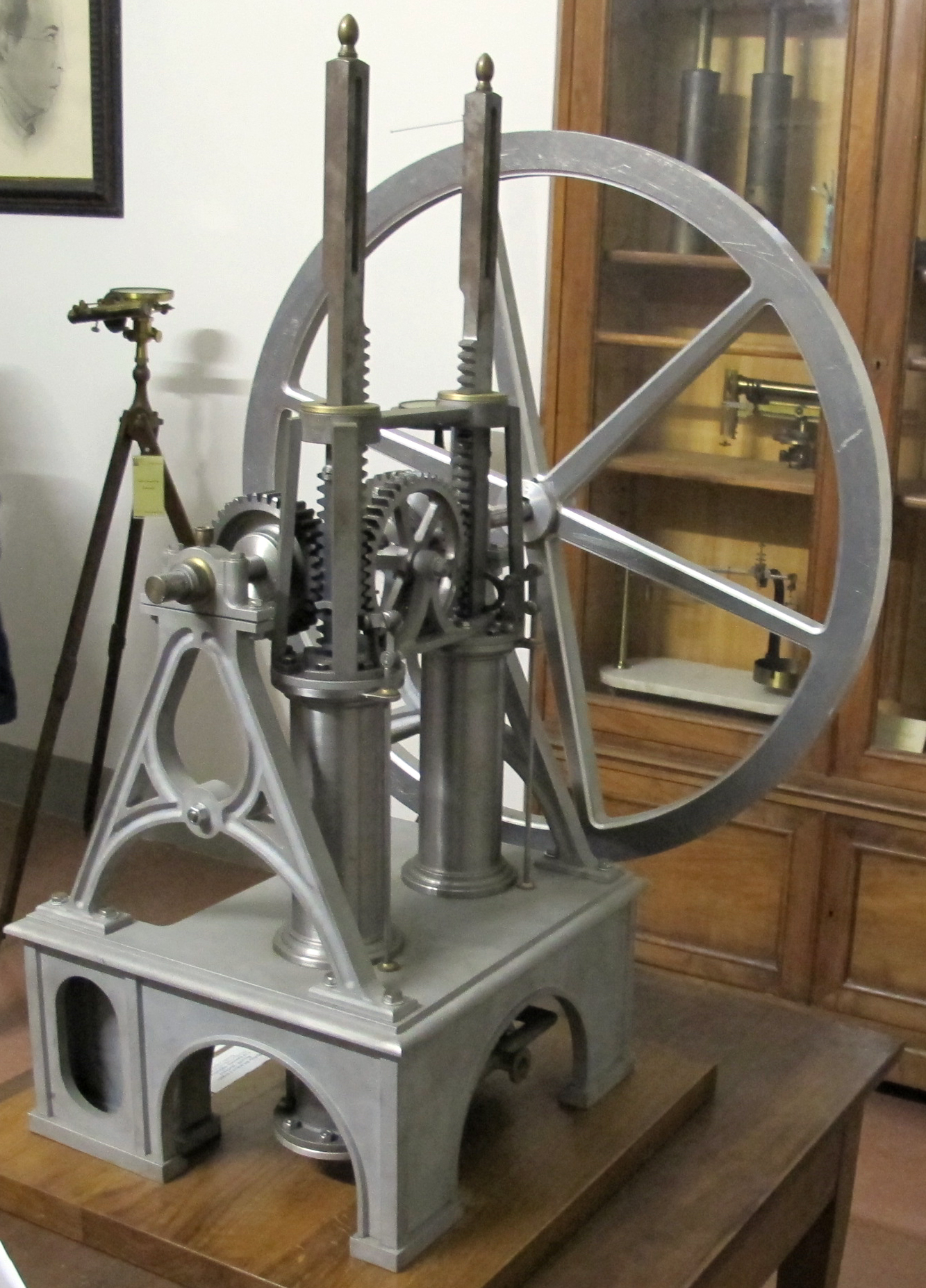
1853 Barsanti–Matteucci engine (scale model)

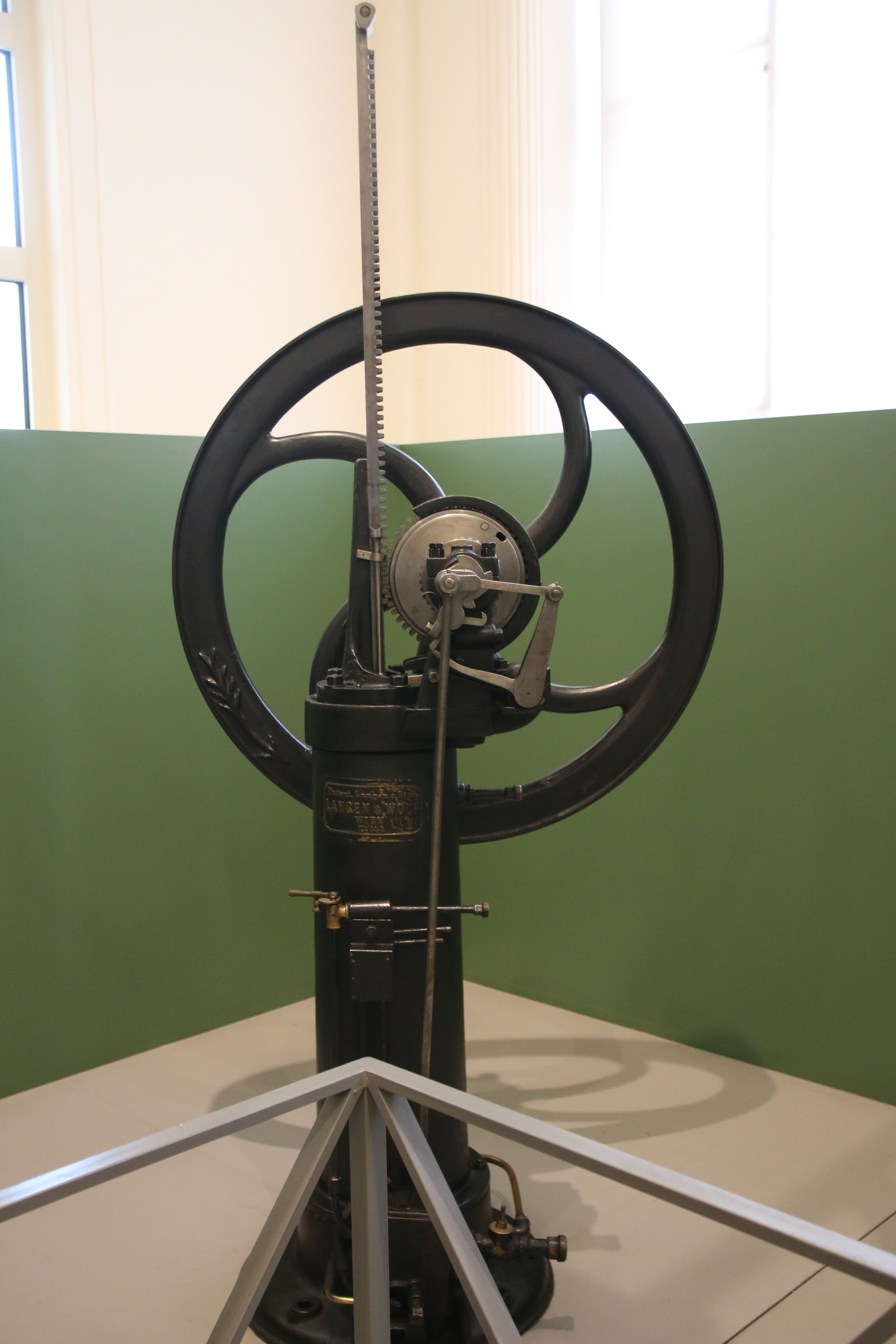
1860s Otto–Langen atmospheric engine

- 1853–1857: A patent for the principle of the free-piston Barsanti–Matteucci engine is granted to Italian mathematician Eugenio Barsanti and engineer Felice Matteucci. The design was intended to provide power by the vacuum in the combustion chamber pulling the piston downwards, following the explosion of a gas fuel within the combustion chamber.
- 1860: Belgian-French engineer Jean Joseph Etienne Lenoir invented an atmospheric (non-compression) gas engine, using a layout similar to a horizontal double acting steam engine. The design's patent was titled Moteur à air dilaté par combustion des gaz. Allegedly, in 1860, several of these engines were built and used commercially in Paris. By 1867, about 280 units of the Lenoir engine had been built. Friedrich Sass considers the Lenoir engine to be the first functional internal combustion engine.
- 1861: The principle for the four-stroke engine is described by French engineer Alphonse Beau de Rochas in the essay titled Nouvelles recherches sur les conditions pratiques de l'utilisation de la chaleur et en général de la force motrice. Avec application au chemin de fer et à la navigation. De Rochas applied for a patent, however it was declared invalid two years later.
- 1862: A prototype four-stroke engine, created from a modified Lenoir engine, is built by German engineers Nicolaus Otto and Michael Zons. The engine was only able to run for a few minutes before it self-destructed.
- 1864–1875: The first petrol-powered automobile – a prototype handcart – is built by German inventor Siegfried Marcus.
- 1864: The first commercially successful internal combustion engine – a gas-fuelled atmospheric engine – is produced by German engineers Eugen Langen and Nicolaus Otto. The engine won a gold medal at the Paris Exhibition in 1867 and was patented in 1868. Fuel consumption of this engine was less than half that of the Lenoir and Hugon engines.
- 1865: The Hugon engine – an improved version of the Lenoir engine with flame ignition, better fuel economy and water injection into the cylinders for cooling – is introduced by French engineer Pierre Hugon. This engine was produced commercially for applications such as printing presses and patent offices.
- 1872: The first commercial liquid-fuelled engine, the Brayton's Ready Motor was patented by American engineer George Brayton. This engine used constant pressure combustion and began commercial production in 1876.
- 1876: The first functional Otto cycle engine – called the Otto Silent Engine – is built by Nicholas Otto, Franz Rings and Herman Schumm at the German company Deutz-AG-Gasmotorenfabrik. The engine compressed the air/fuel mixture before combustion, unlike the other atmospheric engines of the time. The engine was a single-cylinder unit that displaced 6.1 dm^{3}, and was rated 3 PS (2,206 W) at 180/min, with a fuel consumption of 0.95 m^{3}/PSh (1.29 m^{3}/kWh). Wilhelm Maybach later improved the engine by changing the connecting rod and piston design from trunk to crosshead, so it could be put into series production.
- 1876: Otto applied for a patent on a stratified charge engine that would use the four-stroke principle. The patent was granted in 1876 in Elsass–Lothringen, and transformed into a German Realm Patent in 1877 (DRP 532, 4 August 1877).
- 1879: A prototype two-stroke gas engine is built by German engineer Carl Benz.
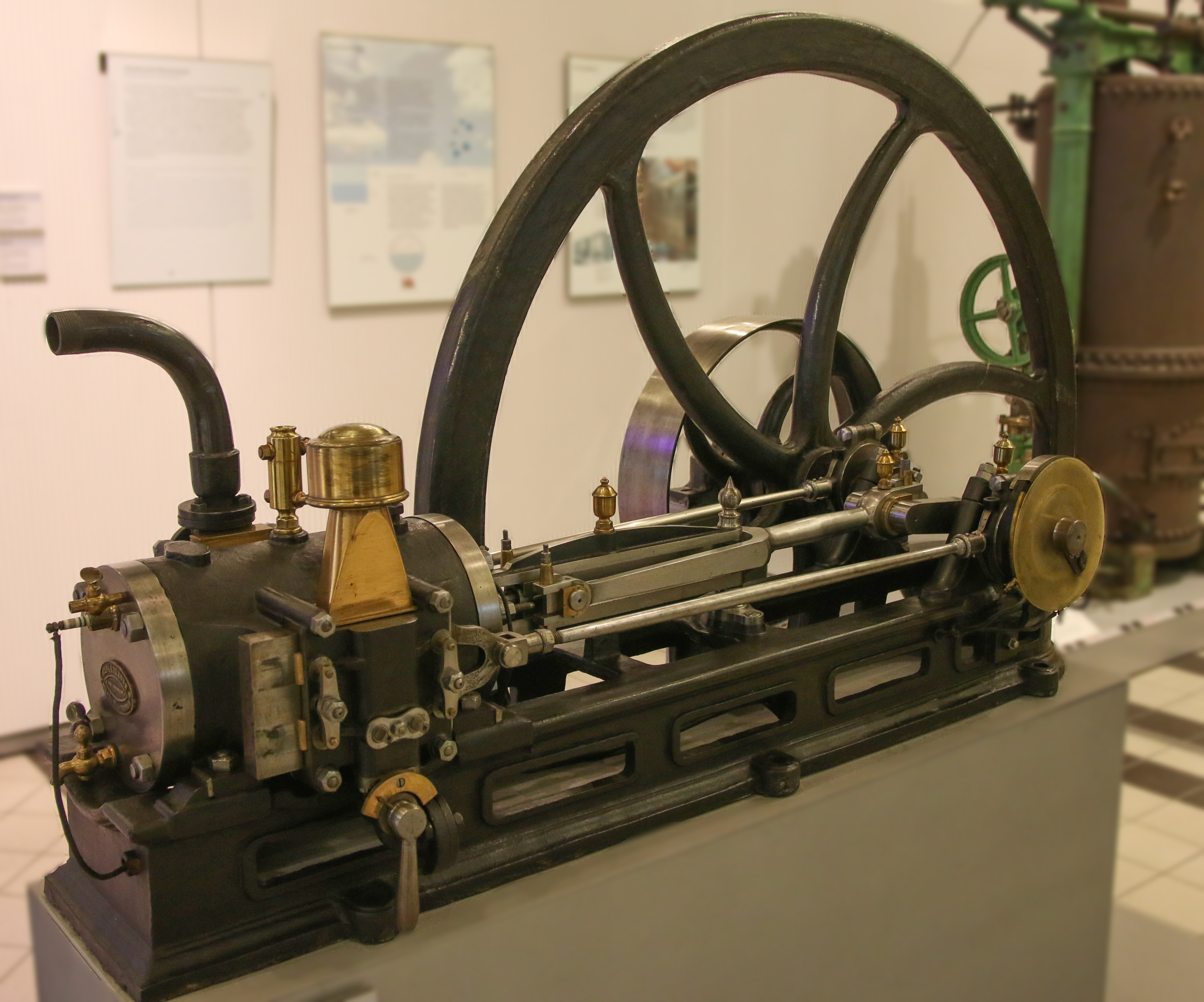
1860 Lenoir gas motor

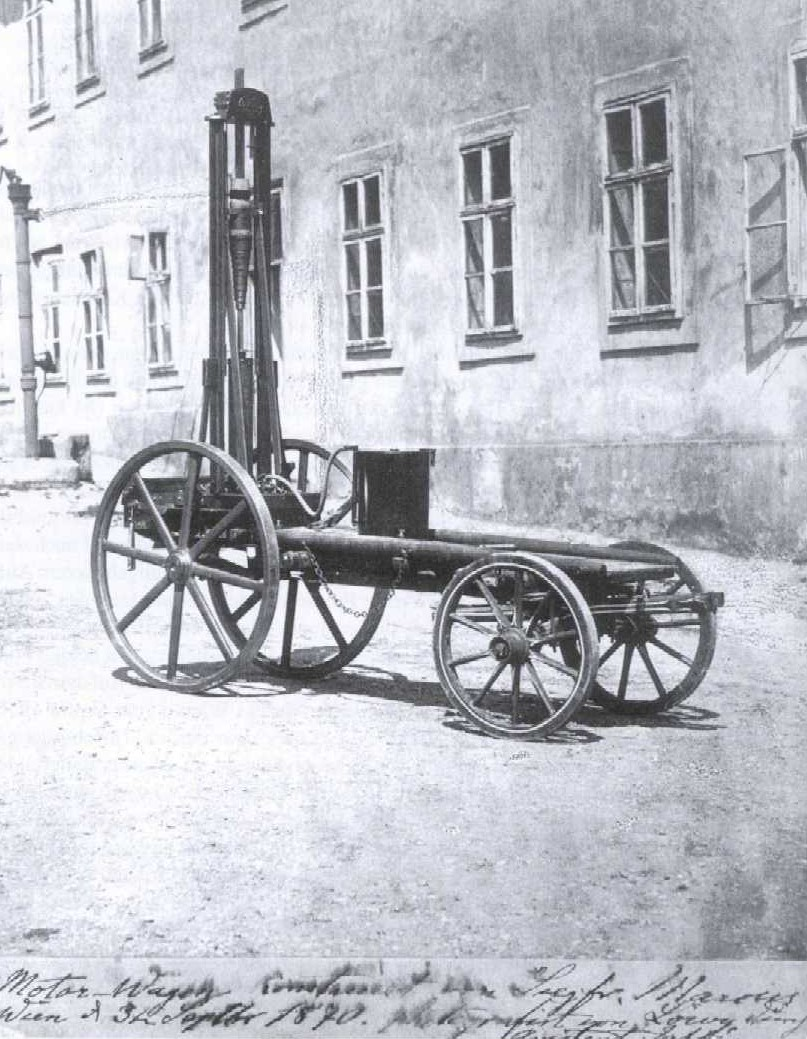
1864–1875 prototype Marcus cart

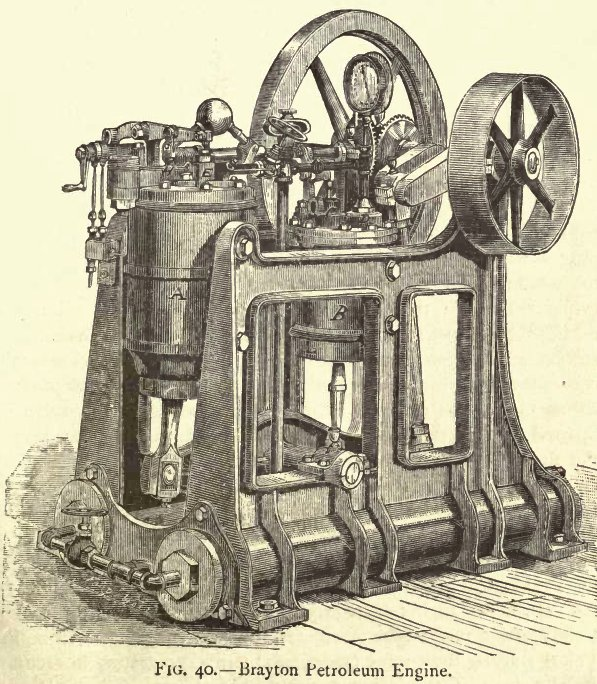
1870s Brayton's Ready Motor

== 1880–1899 ==
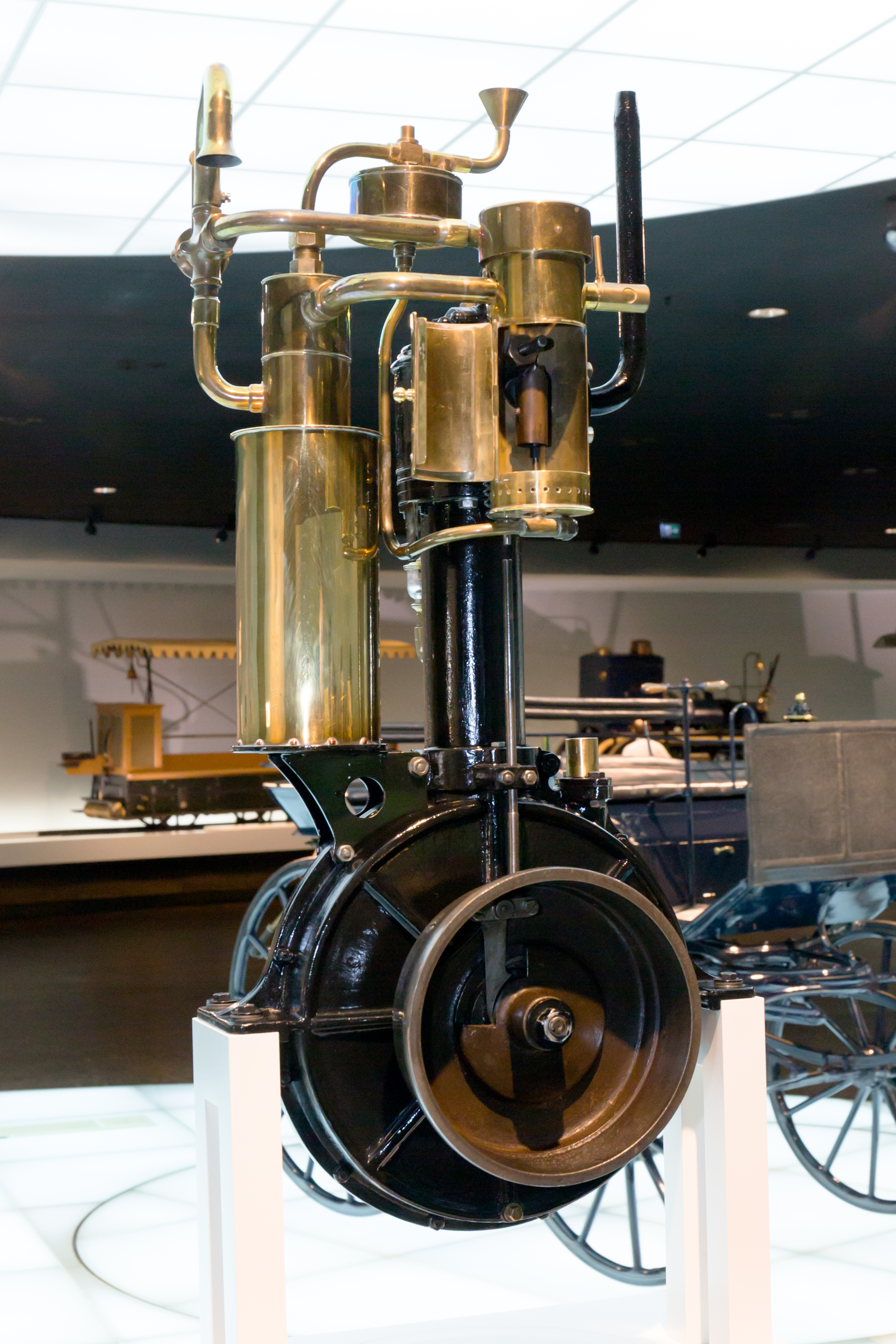
1885 Grandfather clock engine

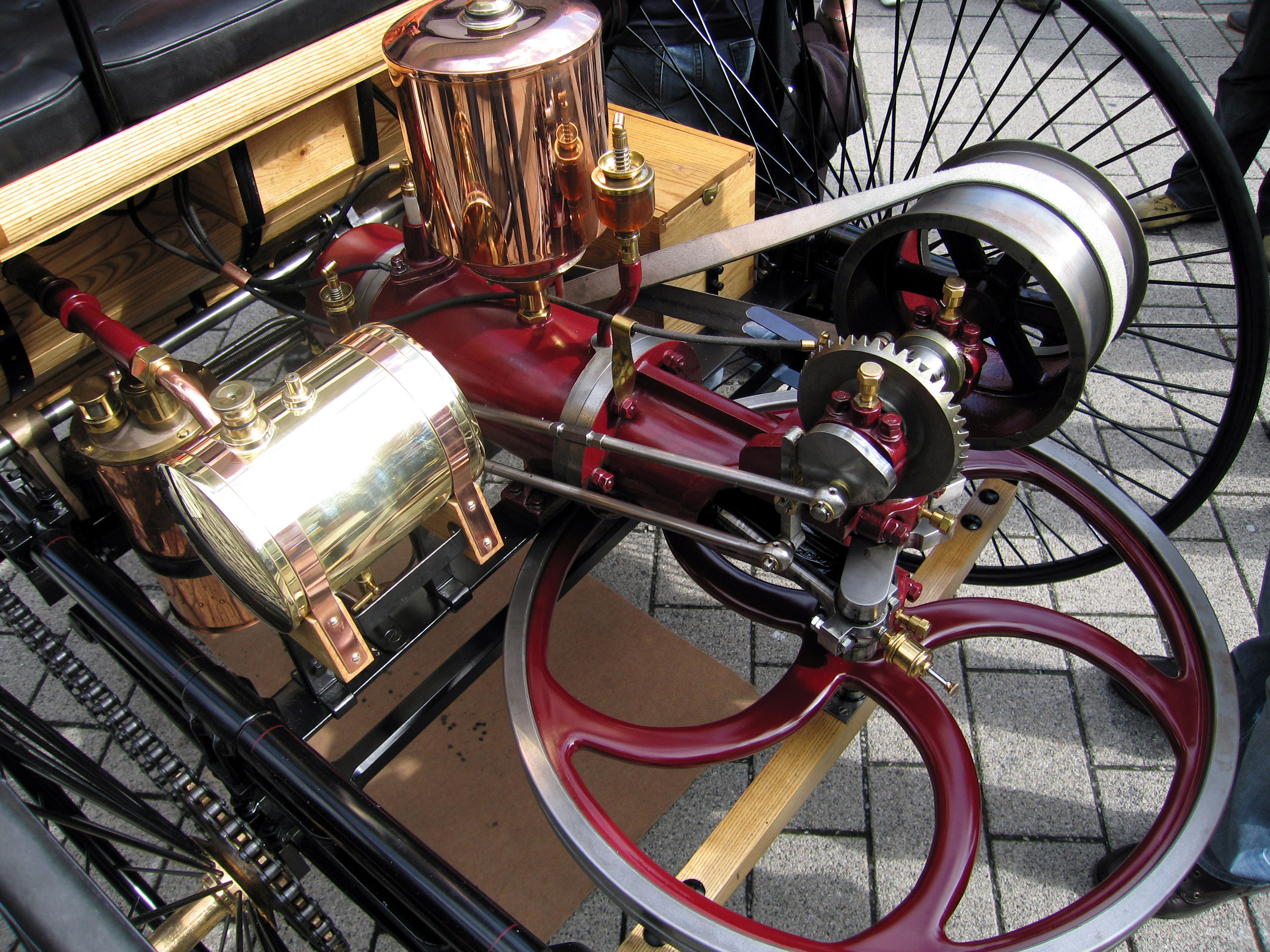
1886 Benz Patent-Motorwagen engine

- 1881: The first commercially successful two-stroke engine design is patented by Scottish engineer Dugald Clerk. This engine is amongst the earliest to use a supercharger.
- 1885: The Benz Patent-Motorwagen – often considered to be the first automobile – is built. It was powered by a 0.55 kW (0.74 hp) single-cylinder four-stroke engine.
- 1885: The Daimler Reitwagen – often considered to be the first motorcycle – is built by German engineer Gottlieb Daimler. The Reitwagen was powered by the Grandfather clock engine, a high-speed (600 rpm), single-cylinder engine producing 0.37 kW (0.50 hp).
- 1888: The de Laval nozzle – used in various rocket engines and jet engines – is invented by Swedish engineer Gustaf de Laval.
- 1888: A rotary engine (not to be confused with a pistonless Wankel engine) is patented by French inventor Félix Millet. This five-cylinder engine was installed in the rear wheel of a bicycle for use in the 1894–1895 Millet motorcycle.
- 1889: The first V engine is built by German engineer Wilhelm Maybach.
- 1889: The first aluminium engine block is created.
- 1891: The Hornsby–Akroyd oil engine – often considered a predecessor to the diesel engine – begins production. The engine was designed by English inventor Herbert Akroyd Stuart.
- 1892: The essay Theory and Construction of a Rational Heat Motor is written by German engineer Rudolf Diesel. The essay discusses several concepts that led to the invention of the diesel engine.
- 1897: The first functional diesel engine – called the Motor 250/400 and designed by Rudolf Diesel – is built by Maschinenfabrik Augsburg in Germany.
- 1897: The first flat engine is built by Carl Benz. The configuration used later became known as a boxer engine, due to the pistons "punching" back and forth simultaneously.
- 1897: An ignition magneto is adapted for use in a motor vehicle engine by German engineer Robert Bosch.

== 1900–1919 ==
- 1902: The first V8 engine is built by French engineer Léon Levavasseur. The engine, called the Antoinette 8V, was used for early French airplanes.
- 1903: The first gas turbine that was able to produce more power than needed to run its own components is built by Norwegian inventor Ægidius Elling.
- 1904: The first overhead valve engine in a mass-production car is fitted to the American Buick Model B sedan.
- 1904 The first V12 engine is built by Putney Motor Works in London for use in racing boats. The engine is known as the "Craig-Dörwald" engine after Putney's founding partners.
- 1905: The exhaust-driven turbocharger is patented by Swiss engineer Alfred Büchi.
- 1905: Cylinder deactivation is employed for the first time.
- 1907: Boris Grigoryevich Lutskij (Boris von Loutzkoy) builds a 6000 horse-power internal-combustion engine for the Russian torpedo-boat Vidnyj.
- 1908: The first Holzwarth gas turbine tested in Germany. The Holzwarth is a form of constant-volume gas turbine where combustion takes place in a chamber closed off by valves.
- 1908: The world's first rotary engine produced for aircraft in commercial quantities – the seven-cylinder Gnome Omega – begins production by French company Société Des Moteurs Gnome.
- 1910: The first overhead camshaft engine in a mass-production car is fitted to the Italian Isotta Fraschini Tipo KM luxury car.
- 1913: The ramjet design for a jet engine is patented by French engineer René Lorin.

== 1920–1939 ==
- 1921: The concept of an axial-flow gas-turbine engine is patented by French engineer Maxime Guillaume.
- 1925: The first gasoline direct injection engine – the Hesselman engine for trucks and buses – is built by Swedish engineer Jonas Hesselman.
- 1926: Theoretical improvements in the efficiency of jet engines are proposed in the research paper Aerodynamic Theory of Turbine Design by English engineer Alan Arnold Griffith. Among the suggestions are the design for a turboprop and changing the turbine blades from a flat profile into an airfoil.
- 1926: The first liquid-propellant rocket is built by American physicist Robert Goddard.
- 1926: The first double overhead camshaft engine for a production car is fitted to the English Sunbeam 3-litre sports car.
- 1927: An important reference book for jet engine design – Steam and Gas Turbines by Slovak engineer Aurel Stodola – is published.
- 1930: The concept of a turbojet engine is patented by English engineer Frank Whittle. The first successful operation of this engine occurred in 1937.
- 1931: The first working pulsejet engine is designed by American engineer Robert Goddard.
- 1935: The first mass-production diesel engine for a passenger car – the Mercedes-Benz OM 138 – begins production in Germany.
- 1937: The first turbojet engine – the Heinkel HeS 1 prototype engine – is built by German inventors Hans von Ohain and Ernst Heinkel. In 1939, the successor Heinkel HeS 3 engine completes the first flight of a turbojet-powered aircraft.

== 1940–1979 ==
- 1941: The Caproni Campini C.C.2 motorjet, designed by the Italian engineer Secondo Campini, was the first aircraft to incorporate an afterburner. The first flight of a C.C.2, with its afterburners operating, took place on 11 April 1941.
- 1942: The first operational jet engine-powered airplane – the German Messerschmitt Me 262 fighter-bomber airplane – completes its first flight.
- 1949: The first airplane powered by a ramjet engine – the Leduc 0.10 – completes a test flight. The ramjet engine was designed by French engineer René Leduc.
- 1952: The first gasoline fuel injection system for a production passenger car – a mechanical injection system produced by Robert Bosch GmbH – is used in the German Goliath GP700 small sedan.
- 1957: The first working prototype of the pistonless Wankel engine (sometimes called a rotary engine) is built by German engineer Felix Wankel.
- 1957: First usage of electronic fuel injection (EFI) in a production passenger car, using the American Bendix Electrojector system.
- 1967: The Rolls-Royce RB.203 Trent becomes the first three-spool engine.
- 1969: The Pratt & Whitney JT9D engine was the first high bypass ratio jet engine to power a wide-body airliner.
- 1970: The first geared turbofan engine was created.
- 1979: Honda releases the Honda NR500 with oval pistons.

== 1980 to present ==
- 1981: Ferrari 126C F1 car used a Hot vee turbocharged engine in 1981.
- 1983: Isuzu builds a ceramic engine that runs on diesel and consumes half the fuel of other comparable engines at the time. Ceramic was used as the material in the cylinders of the engine.
- 1985: The General Electric GE36 propfan runs for the first time.
- 1989: VTEC was introduced as a DOHC (dual overhead camshaft) system in Japan in the 1989 Honda Integra XSim
- Early 1990s: Carburetors had been replaced by fuel injection.
- 1991: Toyota develops laser-clad valve seats. They entered mass production in 1997.
- 1995: Toyota introduces VVT-i.
- 1998: From 1998 to 2000, the McLaren Formula One team used Mercedes-Benz engines with beryllium-aluminium-alloy pistons. The use of beryllium engine components was banned following a protest by Scuderia Ferrari. At one point the material was also used in cylinder liners.
- 2004: The first scramjet-powered airplane – the NASA X-43 prototype – completes a test flight.
- 2006: Mercedes-Benz adopts the use of twin-wire arc spraying to produce highly smooth cylinder liners.
- 2006: The BMW Hydrogen 7 is offered with a hydrogen internal combustion engine
- 2008: BMW N63 was the first production Hot vee turbocharged engine, used in the US-made BMW X6 since 2008.
- 2008: Ford publishes the use of a Plasma Transferred Wire Arc process for making highly smooth cylinder liners, used in mass production in 2015.
- 2011: Mitsubishi develops a gas turbine with a combustion temperature of 1600°C.
- 2013: General Electric starts development of the GE9X with a compression ratio of 61:1.
- 2014: Liquidpiston shows a prototype of an engine with a design similar to an inverted Wankel engine: The combustion chamber is triangular while the rotor is oval.
- 2016: Qoros Auto shows a vehicle with a camless piston engine. In 2020, Koenigsegg showed the idea again.
- 2017: The 2019 Infiniti QX50 is available with a turbocharged Variable compression ratio engine.
- 2017: Achates Power shows a maximum brake thermal efficiency of 55 percent in a reciprocating engine.
- 2020: Maserati introduces pre-chamber ignition in its commercially available Nettuno engine.
- 2021: During the COP26 conference, 24 countries committed to all new cars sold being zero emission vehicles (effectively banning the production of petrol-powered or diesel-powered cars) by the year 2040.
- 2022: The Avadi MA-250 engine features a design in which the piston and connecting rods rotate during engine operation.
- 2022: Hyundai stops internal combustion engine development.
- 2023: The first ammonia powered engine for cars is developed by GAC Group.
- 2024: WinGD, announces testing of variable compression ratio on a two stroke marine low speed engine.

== See also ==
- Timeline of heat engine technology
- Timeline of motor vehicle brands
