= Lenoir cycle =

Idealized thermodynamic cycle used in engines

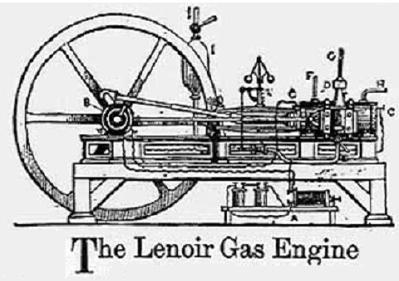
Lenoir gas engine 1860

The Lenoir cycle is an idealized thermodynamic cycle often used to model a pulse jet engine. It is based on the operation of an engine patented by Jean Joseph Etienne Lenoir in 1860. This engine is often thought of as the first commercially produced internal combustion engine. The absence of any compression process in the design leads to lower thermal efficiency than the more well known Otto cycle and Diesel cycle.

== The cycle ==
In the cycle, an ideal gas undergoes

1–2: Constant volume (isochoric) heat addition;
2–3: Isentropic expansion;
3–1: Constant pressure (isobaric) heat rejection.

The expansion process is isentropic and hence involves no heat interaction. Energy is absorbed as heat during the isochoric heating and rejected as work during the isentropic expansion. Waste heat is rejected during the isobaric cooling which consumes some work.

=== Constant volume heat addition (1–2) ===
In the ideal gas version of the traditional Lenoir cycle, the first stage (1–2) involves the addition of heat in a constant volume manner. This results in the following for the first law of thermodynamics: ${}_1Q_2 = mc_v \left( {T_2 - T_1 } \right)$

There is no work during the process because the volume is held constant: ${}_1W_2 = \int_1^2 {p\,dV} = 0$

and from the definition of constant volume specific heats for an ideal gas: $c_v = \frac{R}{{\gamma - 1}}$

Where R is the ideal gas constant and γ is the ratio of specific heats (approximately 287 J/(kg·K) and 1.4 for air respectively). The pressure after the heat addition can be calculated from the ideal gas law: $p_2 v_2 = RT_2$

=== Isentropic expansion (2–3) ===
The second stage (2–3) involves a reversible adiabatic expansion of the fluid back to its original pressure. It can be determined for an isentropic process that the second law of thermodynamics results in the following: $\frac{{T_2 }}{{T_3 }} = \left( {\frac{{p_2 }}{{p_3 }}} \right)^{{\textstyle{{\gamma - 1} \over \gamma }}} = \left( {\frac{{V_3 }}{{V_2 }}} \right)^{\gamma - 1}$

Where $p_3 = p_1$ for this specific cycle. The first law of thermodynamics results in the following for this expansion process: ${}_2W_3 = \int_2^3 {p\,dV}$ because for an adiabatic process: ${}_2 Q_3 = 0$

=== Constant pressure heat rejection (3–1) ===
The final stage (3–1) involves a constant pressure heat rejection back to the original state. From the first law of thermodynamics we find: ${}_3 Q_1 - {}_3W_1 = U_1 - U_3$.

From the definition of work: ${}_3W_1 = \int_3^1 {p\,dV} = p_1 \left( {V_1 - V_3 } \right)$, we recover the following for the heat rejected during this process: ${}_3Q_1 = \left( {U_1 + p_1 V_1 } \right) - \left( {U_3 + p_3 V_3 } \right) = H_1 - H_3$.

As a result, we can determine the heat rejected as follows: ${}_3 Q_1 = mc_p \left( {T_1 - T_3 } \right)$. For an ideal gas, $c_p = \frac{{\gamma R}} {{\gamma - 1}}$.

=== Efficiency ===
Plot comparing the efficiencies of the Otto cycle and the Lenoir cycle at different compression ratios. As seen in the graph, the Otto cycle efficiency is always greater for a given ratio.

The overall efficiency of the cycle is determined by the total work over the heat input, which for a Lenoir cycle equals

$$\eta _{\rm th}  = \frac{{{}_2W_3  + {}_3W_1 }}
{{{}_1Q_2 }}.$$

Note that we gain work during the expansion process but lose some during the heat rejection process. Alternatively, the first law of thermodynamics can be used to put the efficiency in terms of the heat absorbed and heat rejected,

$$\eta_{\rm th} = 1 - \frac{{}_3Q_1}{{}_1Q_2} = 1 - \gamma\left( \frac{T_3 - T_1}{T_2 - T_1} \right).$$

Utilizing that, for the isobaric process, T_{3}/T_{1} = V_{3}/V_{1}, and for the adiabatic process, T_{2}/T_{3} = (V_{3}/V_{1})^{γ−1}, the efficiency can be put in terms of the compression ratio,

$$\eta_{\rm th} = 1 - \gamma\left( \frac{r-1}{r^\gamma - 1}\right),$$

where r = V_{3}/V_{1} is defined to be > 1. Comparing this to the Otto cycle's efficiency graphically, it can be seen that the Otto cycle is more efficient at a given compression ratio. Alternatively, using the relationship given by process 2–3, the efficiency can be put in terms of r_{p} = p_{2}/p_{3}, the pressure ratio,

$$\eta_{\rm th} = 1 - \gamma\left( \frac{r_p^{1/\gamma}-1}{r_p - 1}\right).$$

== Cycle diagrams ==
PV diagram of the Lenoir cycle

TS diagram of the Lenoir cycle
