= Bowl Prechamber Ignition =

Combustion process designed for Otto cycle engines

Bowl Prechamber Ignition, abbreviated BPI, is a combustion process designed for Otto cycle engines running on an air-fuel mixture leaner than stochiometric $(\lambda > 1)$. Its distinguishing feature is a special type of spark plug, capable of reliably igniting very lean air-fuel mixtures. This spark plug is called prechamber spark plug. The ignition electrodes of this spark plug are housed in a perforated enclosure, the prechamber. At the engine's compression stroke, some fuel (usually less than 5 % of the total injected fuel) is injected into the piston bowl; this fuel is then forced through the small holes into the prechamber due to the high pressure in the cylinder near top dead centre. Inside the prechamber spark plug, the air-fuel mixture is ignitable by the ignition spark. Flame jets occurring due to the small holes in the prechamber then ignite the air-fuel mixture in the main combustion chamber, that would not catch fire using a regular spark plug.

== Bibliography ==
- Maurice Kettner, Jürgen Fischer, Andreas Nauwerck, Jan Tribulowski, Ulrich Spicher, Amin Velji: The BPI Flame Jet Concept to Improve the Inflammation of Lean Burn Mixtures in Spark Ignited Engines. SAE. 2004. DOI 10.4271/2004-01-0035. ISBN 0-7680-1319-4
- Richard van Basshuysen: Ottomotor mit Direkteinspritzung und Direkteinblasung: Ottokraftstoffe, Erdgas, Methan, Wasserstoff, 4th edition, Springer, Wiesbaden, 2017. ISBN 9783658122157. p. 58f.
- Kurt Lohner, Herbert Müller (Autoren): Gemischbildung und Verbrennung im Ottomotor, in Hans List (Hrsg.): Die Verbrennungskramaschine, Band 6, Springer, Wien, 1967, ISBN 978-3-7091-8180-5, p. 285
