= Hippomobile =

Automobile invented by Belgian-French engineer Étienne Lenoir in 1863

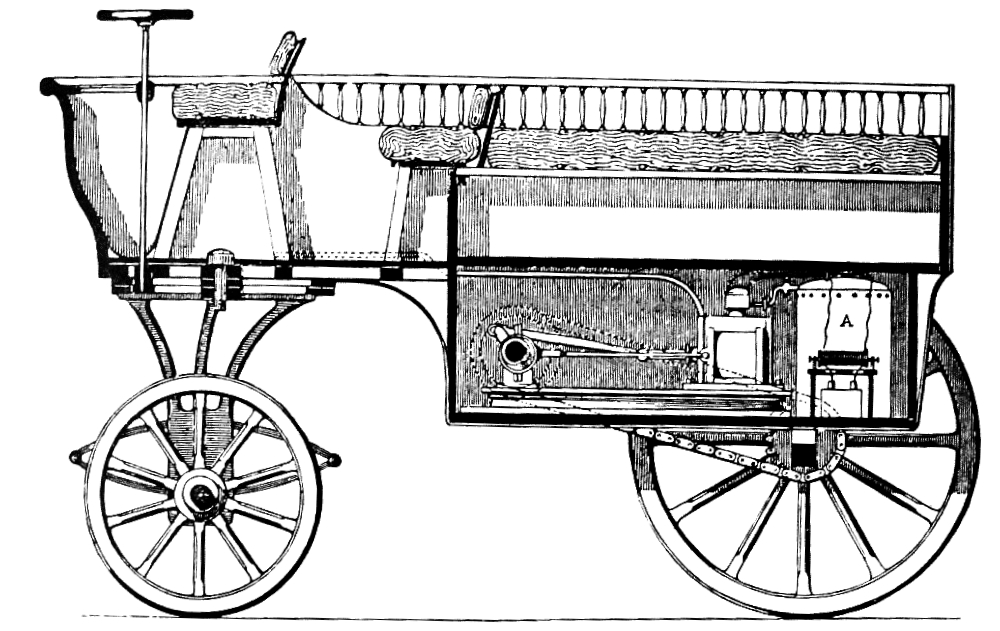
Lenoir Hippomobile

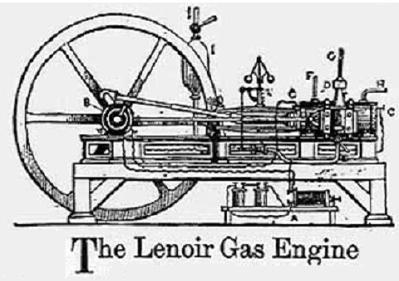
Lenoir gas engine, 1860

The Hippomobile is an early, three wheeled automobile invented by Jean Joseph Étienne Lenoir in France in 1863 which carried its own internal combustion engine. It was based on his 1860 invention, the Lenoir gas engine.

== History ==
In 1863, the Hippomobile, with a coal gas fueled, one-cylinder internal combustion engine, made a test drive from Paris, France to Joinville-le-Pont, which covered around eleven miles in less than three hours, which was a fair achievement at the time.

== See also ==
- History of the internal combustion engine
- Motorized wagons
- Timeline of transportation technology
