= Pierre Hugon =

Pierre Hugon is mainly known through his contribution to the early internal combustion engine, especially the "Hugon" engine, which was the second internal combustion engine to go into commercial production - and was a stationary engine along similar lines to the earlier "Lenoir" engine. According to various patents and other entries Pierre Hugon is variously described as a "Civil Engineer", and also as "directeur de la Compagnie du Gaz de Paris". In 1866 the London Gazette informs us that he is resident in Paris at 56 Rue de l'Orient, and in his US patent of 1874 he is still listed as a resident of Paris.

== List of Patents ==
Pierre Hugon was responsible for several patents, for example :

- French Patents 210-212 of 1858 in relation to engines power by explosion of gas/air mixtures
- UK Patent No 615 of 1860 "Improvements in obtaining and applying motive power"
- UK Patent No 1915 of 1860 "Improvements in apparatus for burning gas in carriages, ships, and other moving structures"
- UK Patent No 2902 of 1860 "An improved mode of firing, or igniting, explosive gaseous compounds in motive-power engines"
- UK Patent No 653 of 1863 - "Improved machinery for obtaining and applying motive power"
- US Patent No 41299 of January 19, 1864 "Improvement in Gas Engines"
- UK Patent No 986 of April 6, 1865, "Certain improvements in gas engines", became void on April 6 of 1872 due to non-payment of £100 additional stamp duty before the expiry of the 7th year.
- US Patent No 48885 of July 18, 1865 "Improvement in Apparatus for Carbonizing Wood"
- US Patent No 49346 of August 8, 1865 "Improvement in Gas Engines"
- US Patent No 150045 of April 21, 1874 "Improvement in Pressure Gages"

== Experimental Engines ==
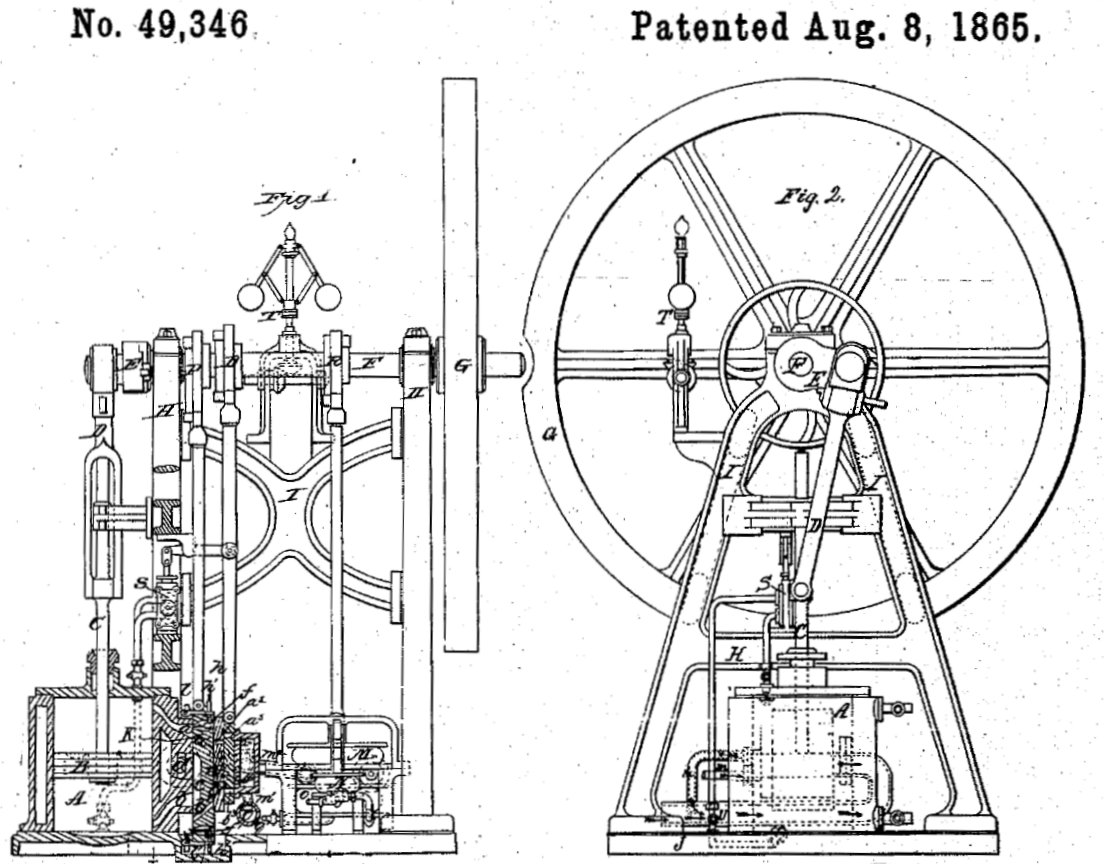
Hugon Vertical Engine from 1865 Patent

It is clear from the subject matter and date of Pierre Hugon's patents that he was active in experimenting with early internal combustion engines even before the first commercial engine was marketed by Étienne Lenoir. In his US Patent 41299 he lists the deficiencies of current gas engines as follows : "I have observed in gas-engines that the direct action of the gaseous mixture when exploded to obtain motive power formed a great difficulty in its application arising from the instantaneousness of the effect produced." He then goes on to describe an unusual engine in which the explosion works on water and both positive pressure and vacuum resulting are used to drive the water and so to move the piston.

Just one year later in US patent 49346, he has returned to more conventional design but still sought to address the deficiencies of the current gas engine, this time identified as the spark ignition system which is blamed for "stoppages of the engine which are incompatible with the regularity and uniformity of action of motive power necessary for industrial or manufacturing purposes". This patent records the essential ideas that are the basis of his commercial engine, the key one being the use of a modified slide valve to allow a flame to ignite the mixture rather than a spark. This same principle was patented by William Barnett in 1838, but Barnett used a rotating cock rather than a slide-valve mechanism. The other novel feature is the use of small quantities of water injected into the cylinder to control temperature.

The engine illustrated in the patent is a vertical single cylinder double acting engine which utilises two rubber gas pumps driven by the crankshaft. One provides the main gas that is mixed with air to power the engine, and the other smaller pump pressurises a gas reservoir that is used to supply gas to the pilot light. The use of flame ignition within the complex slide mechanism extinguishes the flame at every ignition, which is re-ignited by the pilot. This seemingly complex system was quite successful and was used on several early stationary engines.

== The Commercial Hugon Engine ==
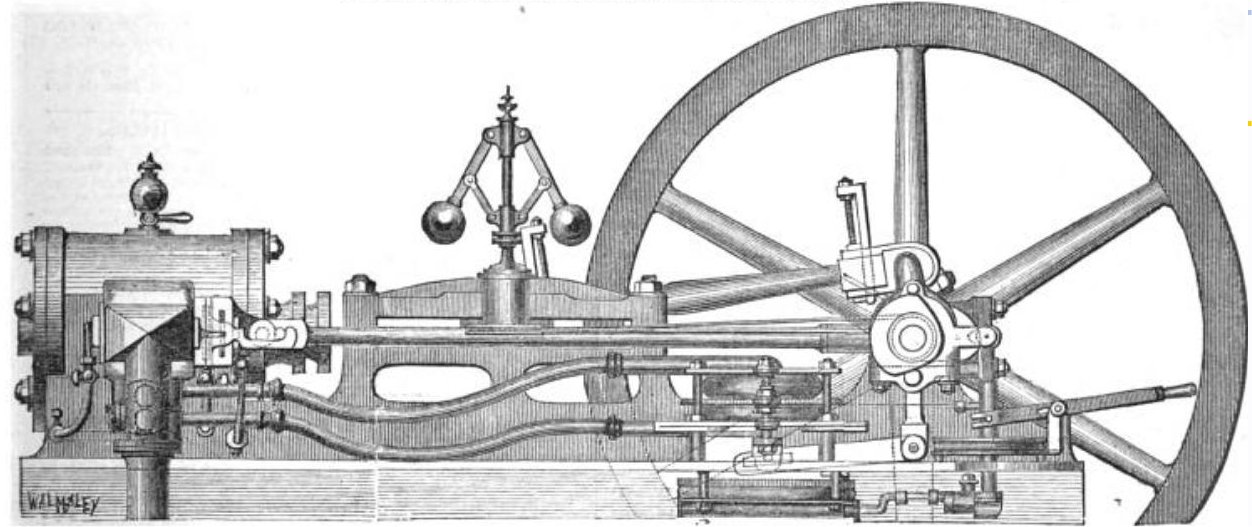
Hugon engine as advertised in 1871

The commercial Hugon engine appeared in 1865, and in appearance much resembled the Lenoir engine, but with flame ignition and water spray injection into the cylinder to control the temperatures. It was manufactured in England by Fred B. Vallance at the Alicel Works, Bridge Street, Greenwich. According to an advert in "The Newspaper Press" in 1871, it was available in Quarter Horse Power £40, Half Horse Power £65, One Horse Power £85, Two Horse Power £110, and Three Horse Power £130. The Newspaper Press was an internal journal of the newspaper industry, and the advent of modern mechanised presses in premises without provision for steam plant and boilers made a business opportunity for compact mechanical power.

Dugald Clerk provides a detailed engineering description of the engines of that era, and states that the Hugon engine was a "great improvement" on the Lenoir engine, and the consumption of gas was reduced. However the gas consumption was still far greater than the Otto & Langen engine introduced at the Paris Exhibition of 1867 (which also used flame ignition), which according to Clerk had a gas consumption "less than half that of Lenoir or Hugon". However, these engines were very noisy in operation (examples are regularly run at the Anson Engine Museum).

One surviving Hugon engine is owned by the Science Museum (London) and is currently on display at the Anson Engine Museum, there appear to be no other survivors. It is the same engine described in detail by Clerk, which was a half horse power engine at that time located at the South Kensington Museum (first edition of his work was in 1886). Clerk notes that "The only parts that gave trouble were the bellows pumps controlling the gas supply to cylinder and igniting ports; these were made of rubber, and deteriorating after some use gave trouble by leaking and occasional bursting. In some of the engines in use they were replaced with metal pumps and a mixing valve. With these additions the engine at the Patent Office Museum ran for many years." The Patent Office Museum was transferred to the South Kensington Museum in 1883. The surviving Hugon engine lacks the rubber bellows and the drive mechanism for the gas pumps, which by this account were probably removed while the engine was relatively new, and still being actively used.

== See also ==
- History of the internal combustion engine
