= George Brayton =

American mechanical engineer and inventor (1830–1896)

George Bailey Brayton
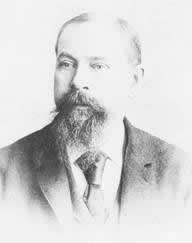
- Born: October 3, 1830; Rhode Island, United States
- Died: December 17, 1892 (aged 62)

George Bailey Brayton (1830–1892) was an American mechanical engineer and inventor. He was noted for introducing the constant pressure engine that is the basis for the gas turbine, and which is now referred to as the Brayton cycle.

== Brayton's Ready Motor ==
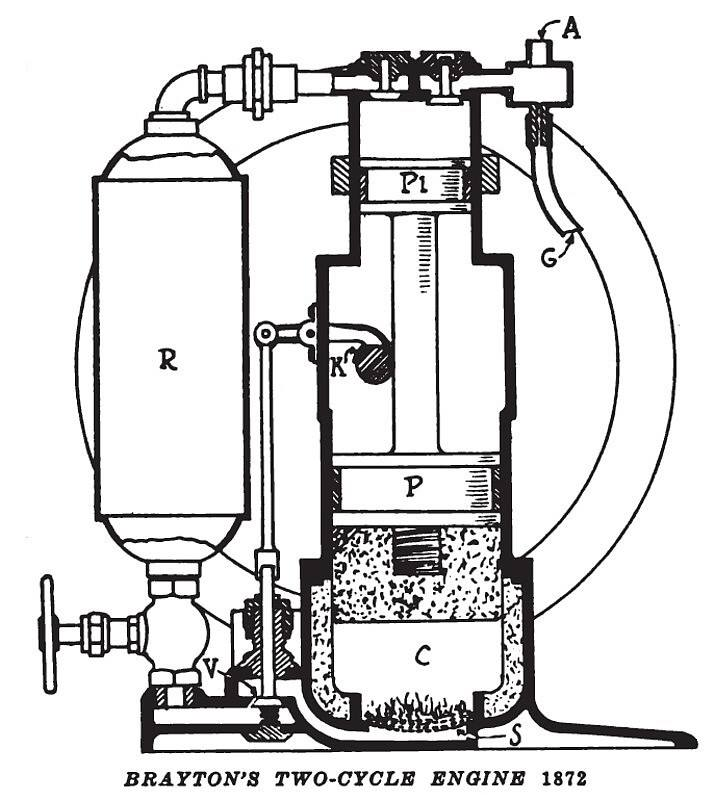
Brayton Gas engine 1872

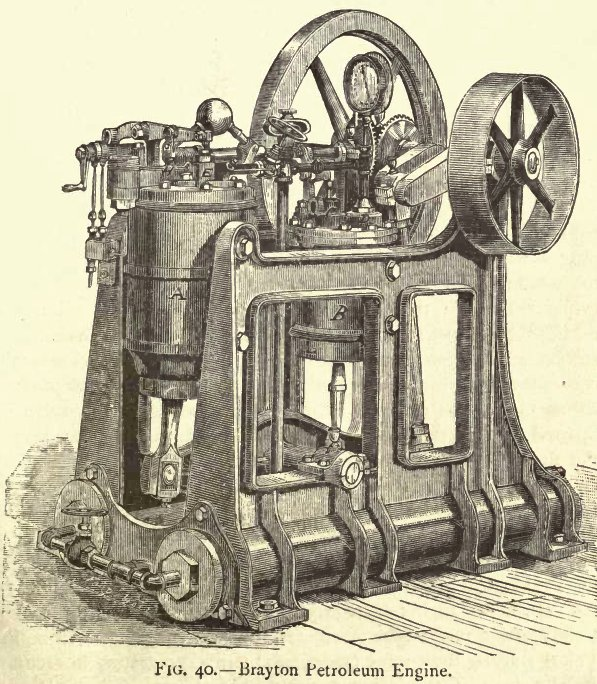
The early Brayton engine (image taken from Gas and Oil Engines by Dugald Clerk in 1886, and used on the cover of some later editions)

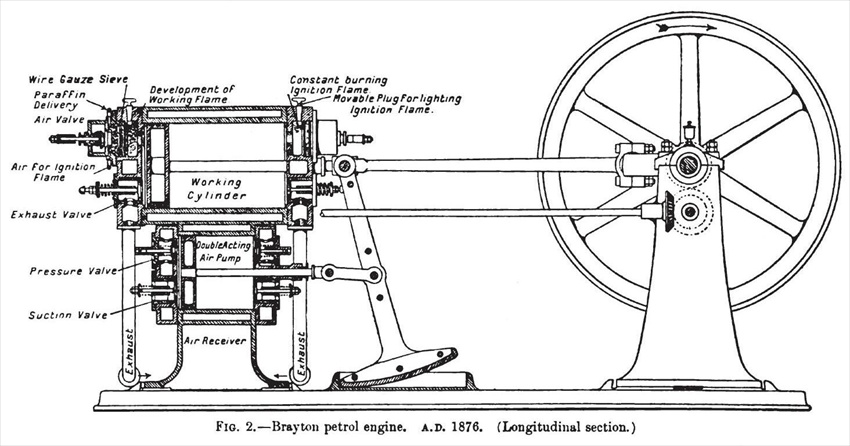
Brayton double acting constant pressure engine cut away 1877

In 1872 George Brayton patented a constant pressure internal combustion engine, initially using vaporized gas but later using liquid fuels such as kerosene and oil, known as Brayton's Ready Motor, The engine used one cylinder for compression, a receiver reservoir, and a separate power/expander cylinder in which the products of combustion expanded for the power stroke. The significant difference from other piston driven internal combustion engines is that the two cylinders are arranged so that the fuel/air mixture burns progressively at constant pressure as it is transferred from the compressor cylinder and reservoir to the working/expansion cylinder. In the original version a gas/air mixture was created by a vapor carburetor, then compressed and stored in a reservoir where it was ignited and then introduced into an expansion cylinder. A metal gauze/mesh was used to prevent the combustion running back to the reservoir. However at times the mesh failed, leading to flash-back or explosion. In 1874, Brayton filed a patent for a liquid fuel injection system. In this version, fuel was introduced as the air passed into the expansion cylinder, thus eliminating the explosion problem. Ignition remained a pilot flame. The principle was referred to as constant pressure combustion, and had been attempted without success by Sir William Siemens circa 1861 using a 4-cylinder engine with a separate combustion chamber. Brayton not only achieved success in making the constant pressure cycle work, but he also made and marketed a commercial product.

Brayton cycle engines were some of the first engines to be used for motive power. In 1881 John Philip Holland used a Brayton engine to power the world's first successful self-propelled submarine, the Fenian Ram.

Also the Selden auto of 1878 used a Brayton cycle engine. This design never actually ran. When the Brayton engine was applied to an omnibus in 1878 as part of a project between Brayton and the engineers George and James Fawcett the latter described the attempt as a 'complete failure'.

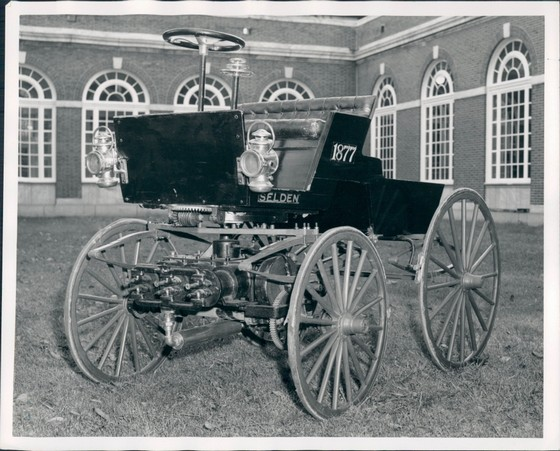
Selden Auto showing Brayton cycle engine

The engine's cycle of operations including sectional drawings and indicator diagrams for both gas and petroleum fueled versions. Details of the way the liquid fuel was introduced are described over 11 pages of Dugald Clerk's book Gas and Oil Engines. The petroleum engine in these tests was made by the "New York and New Jersey Ready Motor Company". This is followed by a similar analysis of Simon's engine which was an adaptation of the Brayton engine made by Louis Simon & Sons, in Nottingham, UK and marketed as The Eclipse Silent Gas Engine. The Simon engine had an added complexity in that it injected some of the water/steam heated by the engine/exhaust into the engine. The indicator diagrams for this engine are also reported by Clerk and show that the addition of the water has little merit in terms of power production, the cooling of the gases and expansion of the steam compensating for each other.

Because the Brayton engine had a slow progressive burn of the fuel/air mixture it was possible to maintain a pilot flame, and so the engine, once lit, needed no form of ignition system. The measured efficiency of the gas engine was intermediate between that of the Lenoir/Hugon engines, and the Otto & Langen atmospheric engine, but the liquid fueled Brayton engine had an advantage in not requiring a gas supply.

The early Brayton gas engine had the engine speed governed by varying the point of cut-off for the admission of the combusted gases into the power cylinder, and the admissions of gas and air to the pump was similarly regulated to maintain the reservoir pressure. The liquid fueled engine reported by Clerk only regulated the cut-off to the power cylinder, and used a pressure relief valve to limit the reservoir air pressure. The reservoir on the Brayton engine allowed it to be readily started if it remained pressurized, though Clerk states that "leakage and loss were so frequent that the apparatus was of little use."

Brayton's engine was displayed at the Centennial Exposition in Philadelphia in 1876, and the Simon variant was displayed at the 1878 Paris Exhibition, and for a few years was well regarded, but within a short time the Otto engine became more popular. However, it was considered the first safe and practical oil engine and also served as inspiration to George B. Selden. As a production engine the design evolved over time, and according to Henry de Graffigny in Gas and Petroleum Engines, it was available in both vertical and horizontal forms.

A Brayton Engine is preserved in the Smithsonian Institution in the American History museum, and a later Brayton engine which powered one of John Philip Holland's early submarines is preserved in the Paterson Museum in the Old Great Falls Historic District of Paterson, New Jersey.

== Brayton's contributions to the Diesel engine ==
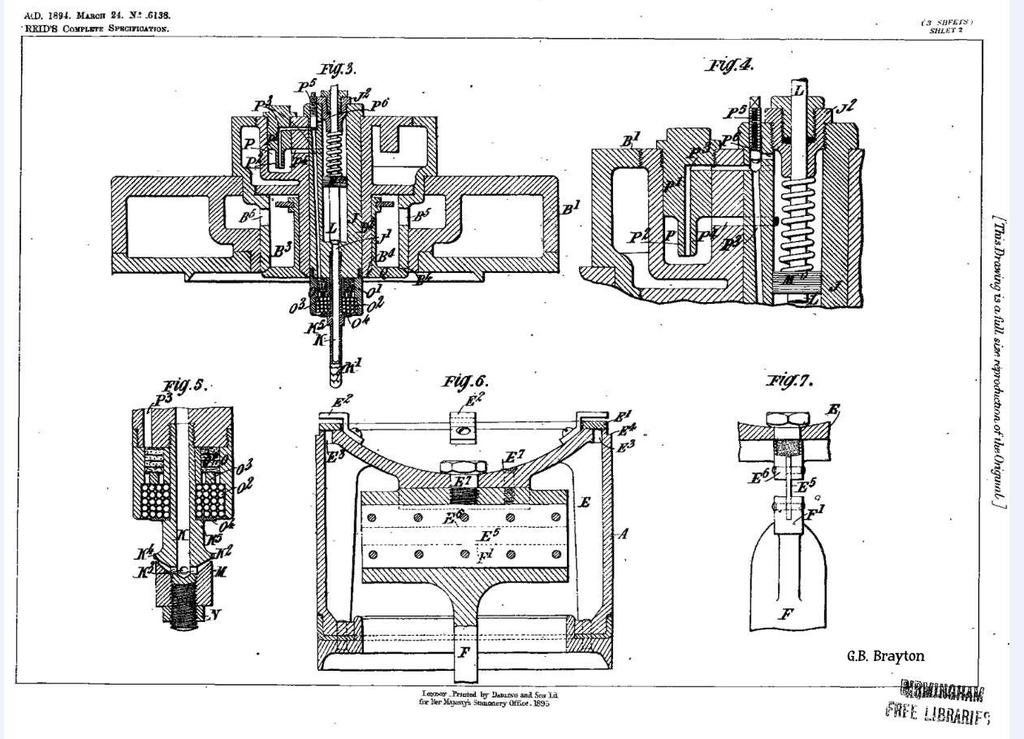
Brayton air blast injection system 1890

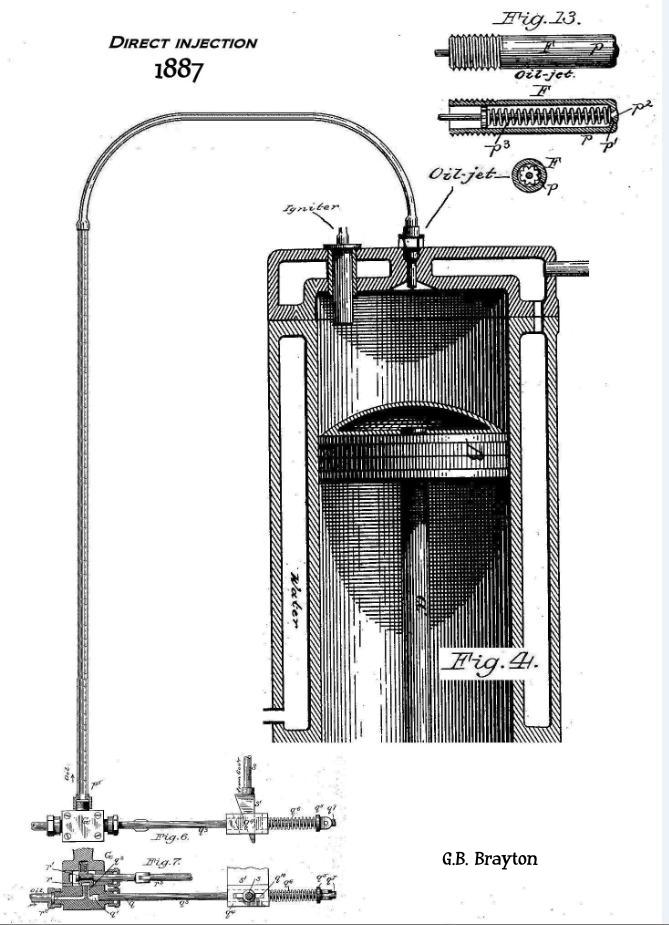
Brayton direct injection 1887

In 1887 Brayton constructed a 4 stroke engine that used a glowing platinum igniter as a source for ignition and a metered pressurized injection system with an oil atomizing direct fuel injector (U.S. patent #432,114). Brayton states: “I have discovered that heavy oils can be mechanically converted into a finely divided condition within a firing portion of the cylinder, or in a communicating firing chamber.” Another part reads, “I have for the first time, so far as my knowledge extends, regulated speed by variably controlling the direct discharge of liquid fuel into the combustion chamber or cylinder into a finely divided condition highly favorable to immediate combustion.” This was likely the first engine to use a lean-burn system to regulate engine speed and output. In this manner, the engine fired on every power stroke and speed and output were controlled solely by the quantity of fuel injected. Bosch later further developed this type of metered injection system. In 1890 Brayton filed a patent (granted in 1892) for another 4 stroke engine with an air blast fuel injection system ( U.S. patent# 432,260) . Rudolf Diesel's first engines used an air blast atomization system that was very similar to Brayton's . Unlike Diesel's engine Brayton's engine was fairly low compression. The ignition source was a constantly glowing mesh of platinum.

== See also ==
- History of the internal combustion engine
- Brayton cycle history
- Selden Auto
