= Eugenio Barsanti =

Italian engineer (1821–1864)

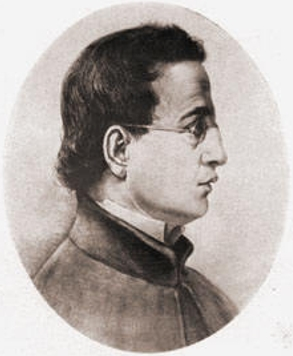
- Eugenio Barsanti
- Born: Niccolò Barsanti; 18 October 1821; Pietrasanta, Grand Duchy of Tuscany
- Died: 19 April 1864 (aged 42); Seraing, Belgium
- Occupations: Engineer; Catholic priest
- Known for: Internal combustion engine

Eugenio Barsanti (12 October 1821 – 19 April 1864), also named Nicolò, was an Italian engineer and Catholic priest who, together with Felice Matteucci, invented the first internal combustion engine in 1853. Their patent request was granted in London on 12 June 1854, and published in London's Morning Journal under the title "Specification of Eugene Barsanti and Felix Matteucci, Obtaining Motive Power by the Explosion of Gasses", as documented by the Fondazione Barsanti e Matteucci.

== Biography ==
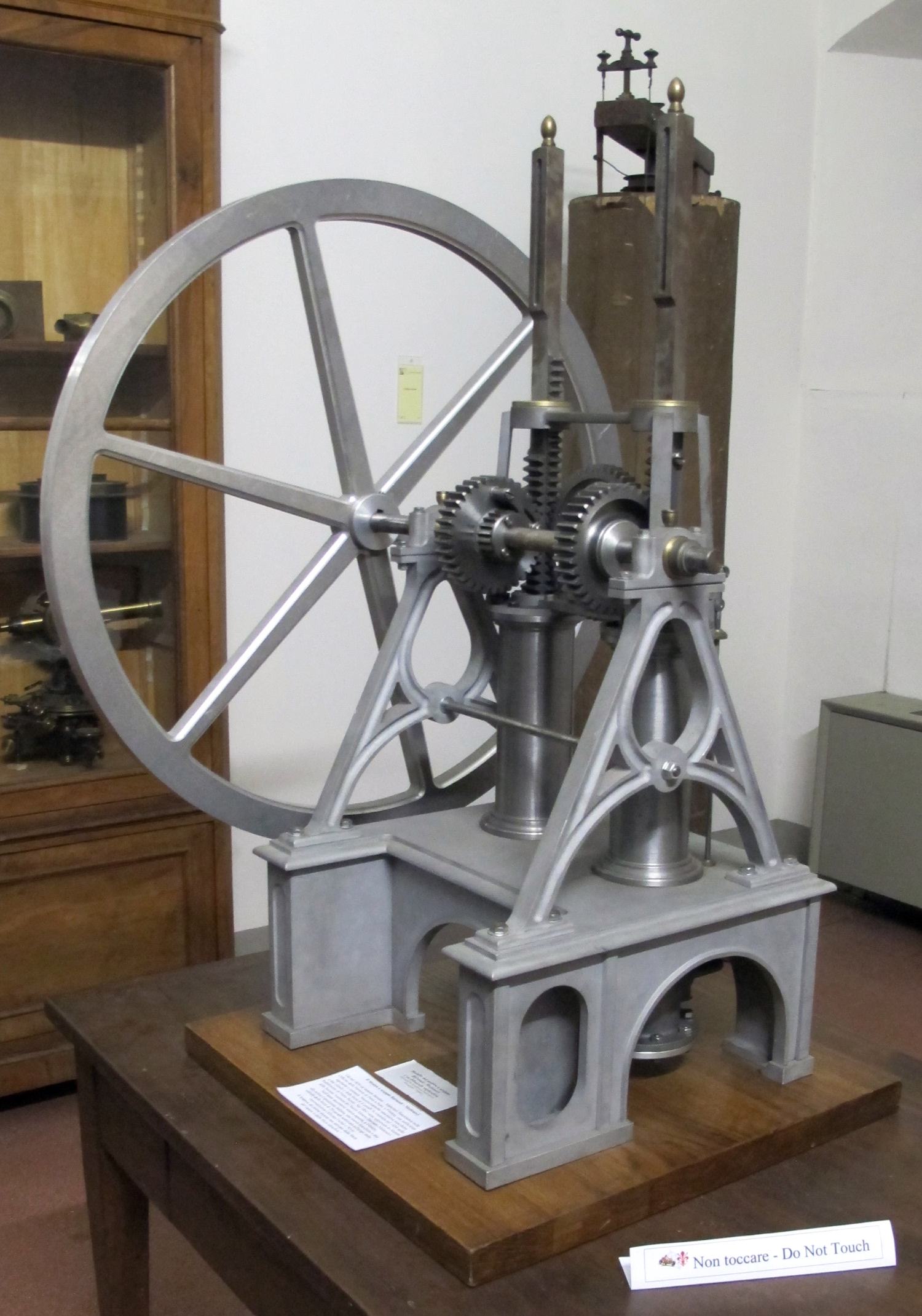
Model of the Barsanti-Matteucci engine in the Osservatorio Ximeniano in Florence

Barsanti was born in Pietrasanta, Tuscany. Lean and short of stature, he studied in a Catholic scientific-oriented institute near Lucca, in Tuscany, and entered the novitiate of the Piarist Fathers or Scolopi, who were known for being open to scientific study, in Florence in 1838.

In 1841 Barsanti began teaching in the Collegio San Michele, situated in Volterra. Here, during a lecture describing the explosion of mixed hydrogen and air, he realised the potential for using the energy of the expansion of combusting gases within a motor.

Subsequently, when teaching in a college level institute in Florence he met Matteucci. Matteucci appreciated the idea for the engine, and the two men worked together on it for the rest of their lives.

On 12 June 1854, they patented their invention in London, as Italian law at that time could not guarantee sufficient international protection on the patent. The construction of the prototype was later completed in the 1860s.

The main advantage of the Barsanti-Matteucci engine was the use of the return force of the piston due to the cooling of the gas. Other approaches based on the pushing force of the explosion, like the one developed by France's Etienne Lenoir, were slower. The Barsanti-Matteucci engine was proven to be much more efficient, and won a silver medal from the institute of science of Lombardy.

In 1856, Barsanti and Matteucci developed a two-cylinder 5 HP motor and two years later they built a counter-working two-piston engine.

Barsanti thought the new engine was a great improvement over the steam engine; it was much safer and less cumbersome and quick to operate. The main target was to provide mechanical energy in factories and for naval propulsion. It was not light enough for use as automotive engine.

After some searching, Barsanti and Matteucci selected the John Cockerill foundry in Seraing, Belgium to mass-produce a 4 hp (3.0 kW; 4.1 PS) engine. Orders for soon followed from many countries within Europe.

Barsanti died suddenly at Seraing of typhoid fever, on 30 March 1864, and Matteucci was left alone to lead the business. The development of the engine failed and Matteucci returned to his first occupation, hydraulics.

When Nicolaus Otto patented his engine, Matteucci unsuccessfully argued he and his partner Barsanti were the originators.

Many documents concerning the patents of Barsanti and Matteucci’s motor are preserved in the archive of the Museo Galileo library in Florence.

== See also ==
- Reciprocating engine
- Two-stroke cycle
- Internal combustion engine
- History of the internal combustion engine
- List of Roman Catholic scientist-clerics
