= Spark-ignition engine =

Type of internal combustion engine

Spark ignition engine working cycle

A spark-ignition engine (SI engine) is an internal combustion engine, generally a petrol engine, where the combustion process of the air-fuel mixture is ignited by a spark from a spark plug. This is in contrast to compression-ignition engines, typically diesel engines, where the heat generated from compression together with the injection of fuel is enough to initiate the combustion process, without needing any external spark.

== Fuels ==
Spark-ignition engines are commonly known as petrol engines in most parts of the world, while the term "gas" (shorthand for "gasoline") engines is used primarily in America. Spark-ignition engines can (and increasingly are) run on fuels other than petrol/gasoline, such as autogas (LPG), methanol, ethanol, bioethanol, compressed natural gas (CNG), hydrogen, and (in drag racing) nitromethane.

== Working cycle ==
The working cycle of both spark-ignition and compression-ignition engines may be either two-stroke or four-stroke.

A four-stroke spark-ignition engine is an Otto cycle engine. It consists of following four strokes: suction or intake stroke, compression stroke, expansion or power stroke, exhaust stroke. Each stroke consists of 180 degree rotation of crankshaft rotation and hence a four-stroke cycle is completed through 720 degree of crank rotation. Thus for one complete cycle there is only one power stroke while the crankshaft turns by two revolutions.

== See also ==
- Multifuel engine
