= Otto cycle =

Thermodynamic cycle for spark ignition piston engines

Otto cycle pressure–volume diagram. The idealized diagrams of a four-stroke Otto cycle Both diagrams: the intake (0-1 and colored green) stroke is performed by an isobaric expansion, followed by an adiabatic compression (1-2 and colored orange) stroke. Through the combustion of fuel, heat is added in a constant volume (isochoric process) process (2-3), followed by an adiabatic expansion process power (3-4 and colored red) stroke. The cycle is closed by the exhaust (4-0 and colored blue) stroke, characterized by isochoric cooling and isobaric compression processes.

Temperature–entropy diagram

An Otto cycle (named after Nicolaus Otto) is an idealized thermodynamic cycle that describes the functioning of a typical spark ignition piston engine. It is the thermodynamic cycle most commonly found in automobile engines.

The Otto cycle is a description of what happens to a gas as it is subjected to changes of pressure, temperature, volume, addition of heat, and removal of heat. The gas that is subjected to those changes is called the system. The system, in this case, is defined to be the fluid (gas) within the cylinder. Conversely, by describing the changes that take place within the system it also describes the system's effect on the environment. The purpose of the Otto cycle is to study the production of net work from the system that can propel a vehicle and its occupants in the environment.

The Otto cycle is constructed from:

- Top and bottom of the loop: a pair of quasi-parallel and isentropic processes (frictionless, adiabatic reversible).
- Left and right sides of the loop: a pair of parallel isochoric processes (constant volume).

The isentropic process of compression or expansion implies that there will be no inefficiency (loss of mechanical energy), and there be no transfer of heat into or out of the system during that process. The cylinder and piston are assumed to be impermeable to heat during that time. Work is performed on the system during the lower isentropic compression process. Heat flows into the Otto cycle through the left pressurizing process and some of it flows back out through the right depressurizing process. The summation of the work added to the system plus the heat added minus the heat removed yields the net mechanical work generated by the system.

== Processes ==
The processes are described by:

- Process 0–1 a mass of air is drawn into piston/cylinder arrangement at constant pressure.
- Process 1–2 is an adiabatic (isentropic) compression of the charge as the piston moves from bottom dead center (BDC) to top dead center (TDC).
- Process 2–3 is a constant-volume heat transfer to the working gas from an external source while the piston is at top dead center. This process is intended to represent the ignition of the fuel-air mixture and the subsequent rapid combustion.
- Process 3–4 is an adiabatic (isentropic) expansion (power stroke).
- Process 4–1 completes the cycle by a constant-volume process in which heat is rejected from the air while the piston is at bottom dead center.
- Process 1–0 the mass of air is released to the atmosphere in a constant pressure process.

The Otto cycle consists of isentropic compression, heat addition at constant volume, isentropic expansion, and rejection of heat at constant volume. In the case of a four-stroke Otto cycle, technically there are two additional processes: one for the exhaust of waste heat and combustion products at constant pressure (isobaric), and one for the intake of cool oxygen-rich air also at constant pressure; however, these are often omitted in a simplified analysis. Even though those two processes are critical to the functioning of a real engine, wherein the details of heat transfer and combustion chemistry are relevant, for the simplified analysis of the thermodynamic cycle, it is more convenient to assume that all of the waste-heat is removed during a single volume change.

== History ==
The four-stroke engine was first patented by Alphonse Beau de Rochas in 1861. Before, in about 1854–1857, two Italians (Eugenio Barsanti and Felice Matteucci) invented an engine that was rumored to be very similar, but the patent was lost.

The first person to build a working four-stroke engine, a stationary engine using a coal gas – air mixture for fuel (a gas engine) was German engineer Nicolaus Otto. This is why the four-stroke principle today is commonly known as the Otto cycle and four-stroke engines using spark plugs often are called Otto engines.

== Processes ==
The cycle has four parts: a mass containing a mixture of fuel and oxygen is drawn into the cylinder by the descending piston, it is compressed by the piston rising, the mass is ignited by a spark releasing energy in the form of heat, the resulting gas is allowed to expand as it pushes the piston down, and finally the mass is exhausted as the piston rises a second time. As the piston is capable of moving along the cylinder, the volume of the gas changes with its position in the cylinder. The compression and expansion processes induced on the gas by the movement of the piston are idealized as reversible, i.e., no useful work is lost through turbulence or friction and no heat is transferred to or from the gas during those two processes. After the expansion is completed in the cylinder, the remaining heat is extracted and finally the gas is exhausted to the environment. Mechanical work is produced during the expansion process and some of that used to compress the air mass of the next cycle. The mechanical work produced minus that used for the compression process is the net work gained and that can be used for propulsion or for driving other machines. Alternatively the net work gained is the difference between the heat produced and the heat removed.

=== Process 0–1 intake stroke (blue shade) ===
A mass of air (working fluid) is drawn into the cylinder, from 0 to 1, at atmospheric pressure (constant pressure) through the open intake valve, while the exhaust valve is closed during this process. The intake valve closes at point 1.

=== Process 1–2 compression stroke (B on diagrams) ===
Piston moves from crank end (BDC, bottom dead centre and maximum volume) to cylinder head end (TDC, top dead centre and minimum volume) as the working gas with initial state 1 is compressed isentropically to state point 2, through compression ratio (V_{1}/V_{2}). Mechanically this is the isentropic compression of the air/fuel mixture in the cylinder, also known as the compression stroke. This isentropic process assumes that no mechanical energy is lost due to friction and no heat is transferred to or from the gas, hence the process is reversible. The compression process requires that mechanical work be added to the working gas. Generally the compression ratio is around 9–10:1 (V_{1}:V_{2}) for a typical engine.

=== Process 2–3 ignition phase (C on diagrams) ===
The piston is momentarily at rest at TDC. During this instant, which is known as the ignition phase, the air/fuel mixture remains in a small volume at the top of the compression stroke. Heat is added to the working fluid by the combustion of the injected fuel, with the volume essentially being held constant. The pressure rises and the ratio $P_3 / P_2$ is called the "explosion ratio".

=== Process 3–4 expansion stroke (D on diagrams) ===
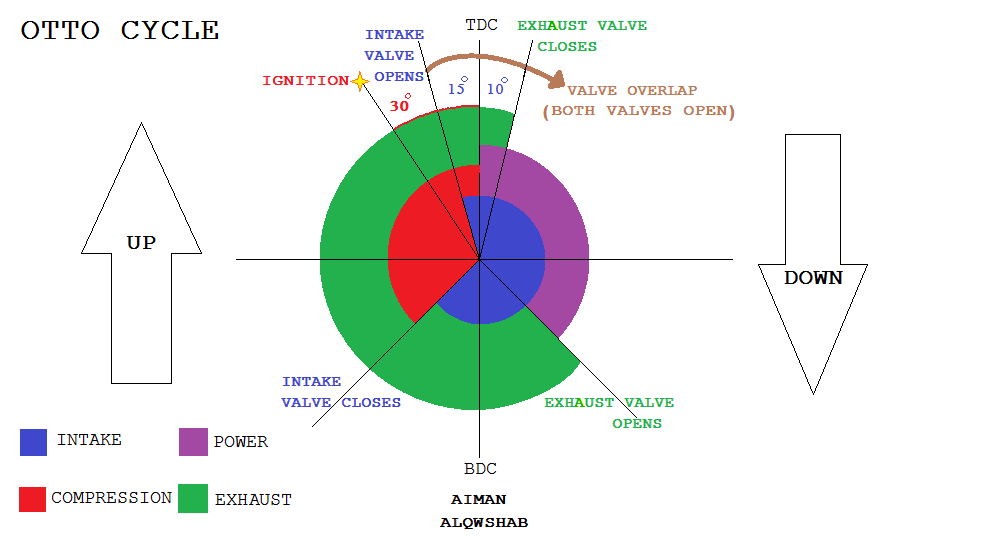
The Otto cycle

The increased high pressure exerts a force on the piston and pushes it towards the BDC. Expansion of working fluid takes place isentropically and work is done by the system on the piston. The volume ratio $V_4/V_3$ is called the "isentropic expansion ratio". (For the Otto cycle is the same as the compression ratio $V_1/V_2$). Mechanically this is the expansion of the hot gaseous mixture in the cylinder known as expansion (power) stroke.

=== Process 4–1 idealized heat rejection (A on diagrams) ===
The piston is momentarily at rest at BDC. The working gas pressure drops instantaneously from point 4 to point 1 during a constant volume process as heat is removed to an idealized external sink that is brought into contact with the cylinder head. In modern internal combustion engines, the heat-sink may be surrounding air (for low powered engines), or a circulating fluid, such as coolant. The gas has returned to state 1.

=== Process 1–0 exhaust stroke ===
The exhaust valve opens at point 1. As the piston moves from "BDC" (point 1) to "TDC" (point 0) with the exhaust valve opened, the gaseous mixture is vented to the atmosphere and the process starts anew.

== Cycle analysis ==
In this process 1–2 the piston does work on the gas and in process 3–4 the gas does work on the piston during those isentropic compression and expansion processes, respectively. Processes 2–3 and 4–1 are isochoric processes; heat is transferred into the system from 2—3 and out of the system from 4–1 but no work is done on the system or extracted from the system during those processes. No work is done during an isochoric (constant volume) process because addition or removal of work from a system requires the movement of the boundaries of the system; hence, as the cylinder volume does not change, no shaft work is added to or removed from the system.

Four different equations are used to describe those four processes. A simplification is made by assuming changes of the kinetic and potential energy that take place in the system (mass of gas) can be neglected and then applying the first law of thermodynamics (energy conservation) to the mass of gas as it changes state as characterized by the gas's temperature, pressure, and volume.

During a complete cycle, the gas returns to its original state of temperature, pressure and volume, hence the net internal energy change of the system (gas) is zero. As a result, the energy (heat or work) added to the system must be offset by energy (heat or work) that leaves the system. In the analysis of thermodynamic systems, the convention is to account energy that enters the system as positive and energy that leaves the system is accounted as negative.

Equation 1a.

During a complete cycle, the net change of energy of the system is zero:

$$\Delta E = E_\text{in} - E_\text{out} = 0$$

The above states that the system (the mass of gas) returns to the original thermodynamic state it was in at the start of the cycle.

Where $E_\text{in}$ is energy added to the system from 1–2–3 and $E_\text{out}$ is energy removed from the system from 3–4–1. In terms of work and heat added to the system

Equation 1b:

$$W_{1-2} + Q_{2-3} + W_{3-4} + Q_{4-1} = 0$$

Each term of the equation can be expressed in terms of the internal energy of the gas at each point in the process:

$$\begin{align}
W_{1-2} &= U_2 - U_1 \\
Q_{2-3} &= U_3 - U_2 \\
W_{3-4} &= U_4 - U_3 \\
Q_{4-1} &= U_1 - U_4
\end{align}$$

The energy balance Equation 1b becomes

$$W_{1-2} + Q_{2-3} + W_{3-4} + Q_{4-1} = \left(U_2 - U_1\right) + \left(U_3 - U_2\right) + \left(U_4 - U_3\right) + \left(U_1 - U_4\right) = 0$$

To illustrate the example we choose some values to the points in the illustration:
$$\begin{align}
U_1 &= 1 \\
U_2 &= 5 \\
U_3 &= 9 \\
U_4 &= 4
\end{align}$$
These values are arbitrarily but rationally selected. The work and heat terms can then be calculated.

The energy added to the system as work during the compression from 1 to 2 is

$$U_2 - U_1 = 5 - 1 = 4$$

The energy added to the system as heat from point 2 to 3 is

$$U_3 - U_2 = 9 - 5 = 4$$

The energy removed from the system as work during the expansion from 3 to 4 is

$$U_4 - U_3 = 4 - 9 = -5$$

The energy removed from the system as heat from point 4 to 1 is

$$U_1 - U_4 = 1 - 4 = -3$$

The energy balance is

$$\Delta E = + 4 + 4 - 5 - 3 = 0$$

Note that energy added to the system is counted as positive and energy leaving the system is counted as negative and the summation is zero as expected for a complete cycle that returns the system to its original state.

From the energy balance the work out of the system is:

$$\sum \text{Work} = W_{1-2} + W_{3-4} = \left(U_2 - U_1\right) + \left(U_4 - U_3\right) = 4 - 5 = -1$$

The net energy out of the system as work is -1, meaning the system has produced one net unit of energy that leaves the system in the form of work.

The net heat out of the system is:

$$\sum \text{Heat} = Q_{2-3} + Q_{4-1} = \left(U_3 - U_2\right) + \left(U_1 - U_4\right) = 4 -3 = 1$$

As energy added to the system as heat is positive. From the above it appears as if the system gained one unit of heat. This matches the energy produced by the system as work out of the system.

Thermal efficiency is the quotient of the net work from the system, to the heat added to system. Equation 2:

$$\begin{align}
\eta &= \frac{- \left(W_{1-2} + W_{3-4}\right) }{Q_{2-3}} = \frac{\left(U_1 - U_2\right) + \left(U_3 - U_4\right)}{ U_3 - U_2} \\
&=1+\frac{U_1 - U_4 }{  U_3 - U_2} = 1+\frac{1 - 4}{ 9 - 5} = 0.25
\end{align}$$

Alternatively, thermal efficiency can be derived by strictly heat added and heat rejected.

$$\eta = \frac{Q_{2-3} + Q_{4-1}}{Q_{2-3}}
= 1 + \frac{U_1 - U_4 }{ U_3 - U_2}$$

Supplying the fictitious values

$$\eta=1+\frac{1-4}{9-5}=1+\frac{-3}{4}=0.25$$

In the Otto cycle, there is no heat transfer during the process 1–2 and 3–4 as they are isentropic processes. Heat is supplied only during the constant volume processes 2–3 and heat is rejected only during the constant volume processes 4–1.

The above values are absolute values that might, for instance, have units of joules (assuming the MKS system of units are to be used) and would be of use for a particular engine with particular dimensions. In the study of thermodynamic systems the extensive quantities such as energy, volume, or entropy (versus intensive quantities of temperature and pressure) are placed on a unit mass basis, and so too are the calculations, making those more general and therefore of more general use. Hence, each term involving an extensive quantity could be divided by the mass, giving the terms units of joules/kg (specific energy), meters^{3}/kg (specific volume), or joules/(kelvin⋅kg) (specific entropy, heat capacity) etc. and would be represented using lower case letters, u, v, s, etc.

Equation 1 can now be related to the specific heat equation for constant volume. The specific heats are particularly useful for thermodynamic calculations involving the ideal gas model.

$$C_v = \left(\frac{\delta u}{\delta T}\right)_v$$

Rearranging yields:

$$\delta u = C_v \, \delta T$$

Inserting the specific heat equation into the thermal efficiency equation (Equation 2) yields.

$$\eta = 1 - \frac{C_v(T_4 - T_1)}{ C_v (T_3 - T_2)}$$

Upon rearrangement:

$$\eta = 1 - \frac{T_1}{T_2} \left(\frac{T_4/T_1-1}{T_3/T_2-1}\right)$$

Next, noting from the diagrams $T_4/T_1 = T_3/T_2$ (see isentropic relations for an ideal gas), thus both of these can be omitted. The equation then reduces to:

Equation 2:
$$\eta = 1 - \frac{T_1}{T_2}$$

Since the Otto cycle uses isentropic processes during the compression (process 1 to 2) and expansion (process 3 to 4) the isentropic equations of ideal gases and the constant pressure/volume relations can be used to yield Equations 3 & 4.

Equation 3:
$$\frac{T_2}{T_1} = \left(\frac{p_2}{p_1}\right)^{(\gamma-1)/{\gamma}}$$

Equation 4:
$$\frac{T_2}{T_1} = \left(\frac{V_1}{V_2}\right)^{(\gamma-1)}$$

where ${\gamma} = \frac{C_p}{C_v}$ is the specific heat ratio and $C_p = \left(\frac{\delta u}{\delta T}\right)_p$ is the specific heat at constant pressure.

The derivation of the previous equations is found by solving these four equations respectively (where $R$ is the specific gas constant):

- $C_p \ln\left(\frac{V_1}{V_2}\right) - R \ln \left(\frac{p_2}{p_1}\right) = 0$
- $C_v \ln\left(\frac{T_2}{T_1}\right) - R \ln \left(\frac{V_2}{V_1}\right) = 0$
- $C_p = \frac{\gamma R}{\gamma-1}$
- $C_v = \frac{R}{\gamma-1}$

Further simplifying Equation 4, where $r$ is the compression ratio $V_1 / V_2$:

Equation 5:
$$\frac{T_2}{T_1} = \left(\frac{V_1}{V_2}\right)^{\gamma-1} = r^{\gamma - 1}$$

From inverting Equation 4 and inserting it into Equation 2 the final thermal efficiency can be expressed as:

Equation 6:
$$\eta = 1 - \frac{1}{r^{\gamma-1}}$$

From analyzing equation 6 it is evident that the Otto cycle efficiency depends directly upon the compression ratio $r$. Since the $\gamma$ for air is 1.4, an increase in $r$ will produce an increase in $\eta$. However, the $\gamma$ for combustion products of the fuel/air mixture is often taken at approximately 1.3.

The foregoing discussion implies that it is more efficient to have a high compression ratio. The standard ratio is approximately 10:1 for typical automobiles. Usually this does not increase much because of the possibility of autoignition, or "knock", which places an upper limit on the compression ratio. During the compression process 1–2 the temperature rises, therefore an increase in the compression ratio causes an increase in temperature. Autoignition occurs when the temperature of the fuel/air mixture becomes too high before it is ignited by the flame front. The compression stroke is intended to compress the products before the flame ignites the mixture. If the compression ratio is increased, the mixture may auto-ignite before the compression stroke is complete, leading to "engine knocking". This can damage engine components and will decrease the brake horsepower of the engine.

== Power ==
The power produced by the Otto cycle is an energy developed per unit of time. The Otto engines are called four-stroke engines. The intake stroke and compression stroke require one rotation of the engine crankshaft. The power stroke and exhaust stroke require another rotation. For two rotations there is one work generating stroke.

From the above cycle analysis the net work produced by the system:

$$\begin{align}
\sum \text{Work} &= W_{1-2} + W_{3-4} \\
&= \left(U_2 - U_1\right) + \left(U_4 - U_3\right) \\
&= +4 - 5 = -1
\end{align}$$

(again, using the sign convention, the minus sign implies energy is leaving the system as work).

If the units used were MKS the cycle would have produced one joule of energy in the form of work. For an engine of a particular displacement, such as one liter, the mass of gas of the system can be calculated assuming the engine is operating at standard temperature (20 °C) and pressure (1 atm). Using the Universal Gas Law the mass of one liter of gas is at room temperature and sea level pressure:
$$M = \frac{PV}{RT}$$
where

- V = 0.001 m^{3}
- R = 0.286 kJ/(kg·K)
- T = 293 K, P = 101.3 kPa
- M = 0.00121 kg

At an engine speed of 3000 RPM there are 1500 work-strokes/minute or 25 work-strokes/second.

$$\sum \text{ Work} = 1\,\text{J}/(\text{kg}\cdot\text{stroke})\times 0.00121\,\text{kg}= 0.00121\,\text{J}/\text{stroke}$$

Power is 25 times that since there are 25 work-strokes/second:

$$P = 25\,\mathrm{stroke/s} \times 0.00121\,\mathrm{J/stroke} = 0.0303\,\text{J}/\text{s}\; \text{or} \;\text{W}$$

If the engine uses multiple cylinders with the same displacement, the result would be multiplied by the number of cylinders. These results are the product of the values of the internal energy that were assumed for the four states of the system at the end each of the four strokes (two rotations). They were selected only for the sake of illustration, and are obviously of low value. Substitution of actual values from an actual engine would produce results closer to that of the engine. Whose results would be higher than the actual engine as there are many simplifying assumptions made in the analysis that overlook inefficiencies. Such results would overestimate the power output.

== Increasing power and efficiency ==
The difference between the exhaust and intake pressures and temperatures means that some increase in efficiency can be gained by use of a turbocharger, removing from the exhaust flow some part of the remaining energy and transferring that to the intake flow to increase the intake pressure. A gas turbine can extract useful work energy from the exhaust stream and that can then be used to pressurize the intake air. The pressure and temperature of the exhausting gases would be reduced as they expand through the gas turbine and that work is then applied to the intake gas stream, increasing its pressure and temperature. The transfer of energy amounts to an efficiency improvement and the resulting power density of the engine is also improved. The intake air is typically cooled so as to reduce its volume as the work produced per stroke is a direct function of the amount of mass taken into the cylinder; denser air will produce more work per cycle. Practically speaking the intake air mass temperature must also be reduced to prevent premature ignition in a petrol fueled engine; hence, an intercooler is used to remove some energy as heat and so reduce the intake temperature. Such a scheme both increases the engine's efficiency and power.

The application of a supercharger driven by the crankshaft does increase the power output (power density) but does not increase efficiency as it uses some of the net work produced by the engine to pressurize the intake air and fails to extract otherwise wasted energy associated with the flow of exhaust at high temperature and a pressure to the ambient.

== See also ==
- Four-stroke engine
