= Felice Matteucci =

Italian hydraulic engineer

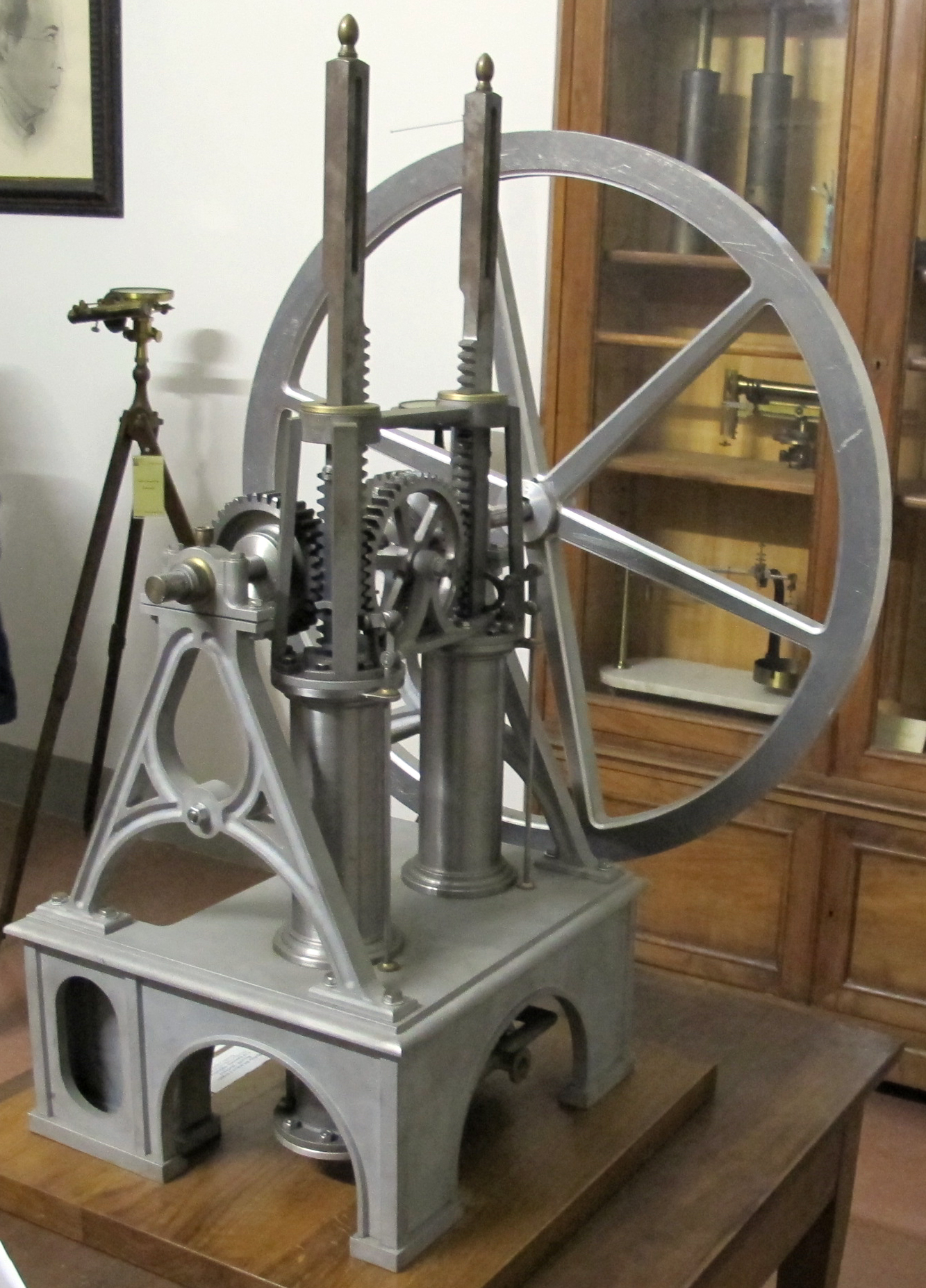
Model of the Barsanti-Matteucci engine in the Osservatorio Ximeniano in Florence

Felice Matteucci (February 12, 1808 – September 13, 1887) was an Italian hydraulic engineer who co-invented an internal combustion engine with Eugenio Barsanti. Their patent request was granted in London on June 12, 1854, and published in London's Morning Journal under the title "Specification of Eugene Barsanti and Felix Matteucci, Obtaining Motive Power by the Explosion of Gases", as documented by the Fondazione Barsanti e Matteucci.

== Biography ==
Born in Lucca, Tuscany, Matteucci studied hydraulic and mechanical engineering, first in Paris, then in Florence. In 1851 he met Father Barsanti and appreciated his ideas for a new type of engine. They worked together to turn the primary concept into a manufacturable item, eventually developing a model suitable for mass production. Its construction was entrusted to Bauer & Co. of Milan, a company also known as Helvetica, which delivered the motor at the beginning of 1863.

The success of the engine, which was much more efficient than the steam engine, was so great that orders started pouring in from as far away as Constantinople. Matteucci and Barsanti reached an agreement for the production of the motor with a company in Belgium, and Barsanti departed for Belgium on February 18, 1864, to oversee the work personally. On the following April 19, Barsanti died suddenly, and all their work came to an end.

Matteucci returned to his previous work as a hydraulic engineer. He studied new hydrometers (to measure the level of a river), rain gauges, and hydraulic operations over rivers.

In 1877, Matteucci defended that he and Barsanti were the originators of the invention of the internal combustion engine. The patent registered by Nicolaus August Otto was indeed very similar to the Barsanti-Matteucci engine. This frustration contributed to Matteucci's illness that eventually caused his death, in his own home in Capannori, near Lucca. The documents concerning the priority of Barsanti and Matteucci’s engine and their patents in England, Piedmont, France, Belgium and Prussia are kept in the archive of the library of the Museo Galileo in Florence.

== Works ==
- Matteucci, Felice (1874). Intorno a due istrumenti automatici che descrivono in modo continuo le curve delle pioggie e delle variazioni nel pelo dell'acqua dei fiumi. Roma: Stabilimento Giuseppe Civelli.
- Matteucci, Felice (1875). Sfioratori a stramazzo per moderare le piene dei fiumi. Firenze: Tipografia Bencini.

== See also ==
- History of the internal combustion engine
