= Alphonse Beau de Rochas =

French engineer

Alphonse Eugène Beau de Rochas
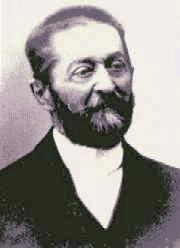
- Alphonse Beau de Rochas
- Born: 9 April 1815; Digne-les-Bains, Alpes-de-Haute-Provence
- Died: 27 March 1893 (aged 77); Vincennes
- Occupation: Engineer
- Known for: Four-stroke internal-combustion engine

Alphonse Eugène Beau de Rochas (9 April 1815, Digne-les-Bains, Alpes-de-Haute-Provence – 27 March 1893, Vincennes) was a French engineer. He was the first to patent the four-stroke engine in 1862, but he did not build one and the idea was subsequently developed by Nicolaus Otto and other engineers.
