= Étienne Lenoir =

Belgian-French engineer (1822–1900)

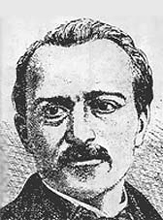
- Jean Joseph Étienne Lenoir
- Born: Jean Joseph Étienne Lenoir; 12 January 1822; Mussy-la-Ville, Belgium
- Died: 4 August 1900 (aged 78); La Varenne-Saint-Hilaire, France
- Known for: Lenoir cycle; Internal combustion engine; Spark plug
- Scientific career
- Fields: Engineering

Jean Joseph Étienne Lenoir, also known as Jean J. Lenoir (12 January 1822 – 4 August 1900), was a Belgian-French engineer who invented the internal combustion engine in 1858. Prior designs for such engines were patented as early as 1807 (De Rivaz engine) and 1854 (Barsanti–Matteucci engine).

He was born in Mussy-la-Ville (then in Luxembourg, part of the Belgian Province of Luxembourg since 1839). In 1838, he immigrated to France, taking up residence in Paris, where he developed an interest in electroplating. His interest in the subject led him to make several electrical inventions, including an improved electric telegraph.

== Lenoir engine ==
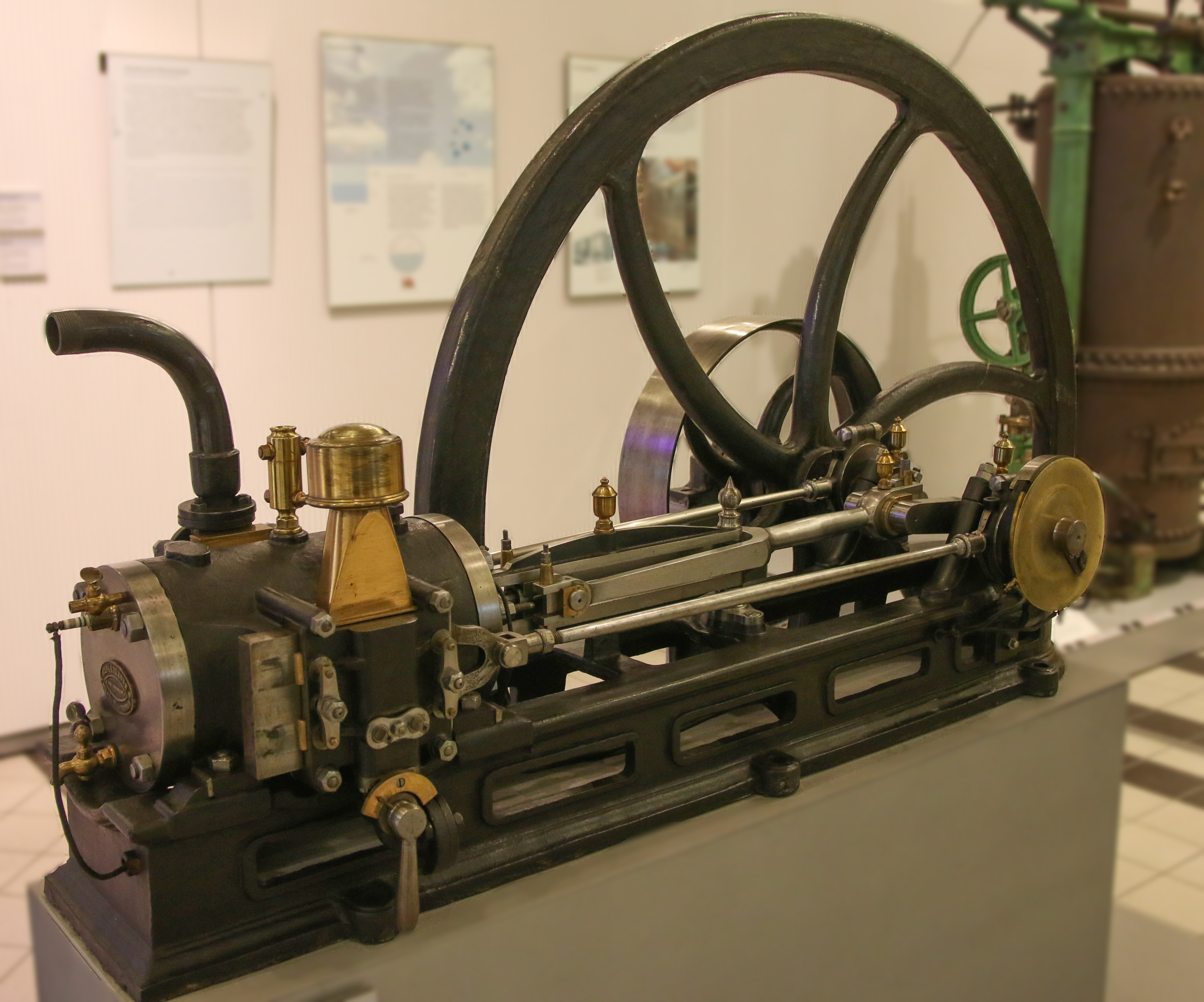
Lenoir motor

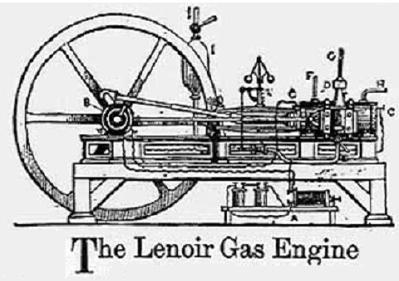
Lenoir gas engine 1860

By 1859, Lenoir's experimentation with electricity led him to develop the first internal combustion engine which burned a mixture of coal gas and air ignited by a "jumping sparks" ignition system by Ruhmkorff coil, and which he patented in 1860. The engine was a steam engine converted to burn gaseous fuel and thus pushed in both directions. The fuel mixture was not compressed before ignition (a system invented in 1801 by Philippe LeBon who developed the use of illuminating gas to light Paris), and the engine was quiet but inefficient, with a power stroke at each end of the cylinder. In 1863, the Hippomobile, with a coal gas fueled, one cylinder, internal combustion engine, made a test drive from Paris to Joinville-le-Pont, covering 18 km in 3 hours.

Lenoir was an engineer at Petiene et Cie (Petiene & Company), who supported him in his founding of the companies of Corporation Lenoir-Gautier et Cie engines Paris and Société des Moteurs Lenoir in Paris in 1859, with a capitalization of two million francs and a factory in the Rue de la Roquette, to develop the engine, and a three-wheeled carriage constructed to use it. Although it ran reasonably well, the engine was fuel inefficient, extremely noisy, tended to overheat, and, if sufficient cooling water was not applied, seize up. German engineer H. Boetius describes in an 1861 essay that the Lenoir engine's fuel consumption was falsely advertised. Instead of the promised 0.5 m^{3}/PSh (0.68 m^{3}/kWh), the fuel consumption (in a Kuhn-built Lenoir engine) was rather in the 1.2–5.4 m^{3}/PSh (1.63–7.34 m^{3}/kWh) range.

Nevertheless, Scientific American reported in September 1860 that the Parisian newspaper Cosmos had pronounced the steam age over. By 1865, 143 had been sold in Paris alone, and production of Lenoir Gas Engines, by Reading Gas Works in London, had begun.

Lenoir had completed work on his engine in 1859 and had a grand unveiling on 23 January 1860, for twenty guests. In his speech he said, "If it works, I will add carburetor heating, at a constant level, which will allow the use of petrol, or gasoline, or tar, or any resin". He turned on the illuminating gas valve, pushed the flywheel, and the engine came to life. In 1860, Lenoir received a patent for "an air motor expanded by gas combustion" from Conservatoire national des arts et métiers, no. N.43624

== Lenoir's automobiles ==
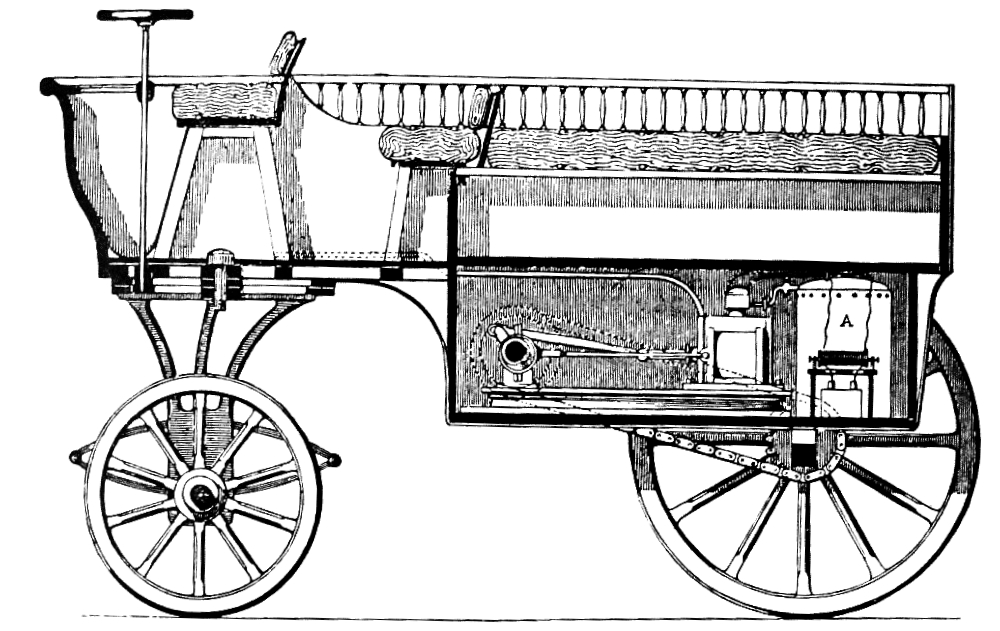
Lenoir's Hippomobile

Dates vary from 1860 to 1863 on when Lenoir built his automobiles. It is apparent that he built a small carriage with his engine around 1860. His automobile of 1862 was capable of 3 kilometers per hour.

In 1861, he put one of his engines in a boat. In 1863, Lenoir demonstrated a second three-wheeled carriage, the Hippomobile, little more than a wagon body set atop a tricycle platform. It was powered by a 2543 cc (155 in^{3}; 180×100 mm, 7.1×3.9in) 1.5 hp, "liquid hydrocarbon" (petroleum) engine with a primitive carburettor which was patented in 1886. It successfully covered the 11 km (7 mi) from Paris to Joinville-le-Pont and back in about ninety minutes each way, an average speed less than that of a walking man (though doubtless there were breakdowns). This succeeded in attracting the attention of Tsar Alexander II, and one was sent to Russia, where it vanished; Lenoir was not pleased. In 1863, he sold his patents to Compagnie parisienne de gaz and turned to motorboats instead, building the first naptha-fueled four-cycle, fueled by ligroin (heavy naptha), in 1888. Jules Verne wrote in his 1863 novel Paris in the Twentieth Century of boulevards crowded with horseless carriages, "the Lenoir machine applied to locomotion."

== Stationary engines ==
Most applications of the Lenoir engine were as a stationary power plant powering printing presses, water pumps, and machine tools. They "proved to be rough and noisy after prolonged use", however. Other engineers, especially Nicolaus Otto, began making improvements to internal combustion technology, which soon rendered the Lenoir design obsolete. Fewer than 500 Lenoir engines of 6-20 hp were built, including some under license in Germany.

== Electrical engineering ==
In 1865, Lenoir returned to electrical engineering. He developed a new type of automatic telegraph device that could send information in written form. This device was of great value during the Franco-Prussian War. He also installed an improved version of his engine in a 12-meter-long boat for a Mr. Dalloz, who used it on the Seine for two years.

== French citizenship ==
Lenoir was granted French citizenship in 1870 for assistance during the Franco-Prussian War, and awarded the Légion d'honneur for developments in telegraphy in 1881. Lenoir was impoverished in later years despite his engine's relative success.

== Honors ==
On 16 July 1900, not long before his death, Lenoir received an award from the ACF (Automobile Club de France), which was a vermeil plate with the inscription, "In recognition of his great merits as an inventor of the gas engine and builder of the first car in the world."

Lenoir Rock in Antarctica is not named after the engineer, but after a scientific instrument maker also named Étienne Lenoir.

Lenoir died in La Varenne-Sainte-Hilaire on 4 August 1900.

== See also ==
- Hippomobile
- History of the internal combustion engine
- Lenoir cycle
- Timeline of hydrogen technologies
