= List of hydrogen internal combustion engine vehicles =

A hydrogen internal combustion engine vehicle (HICEV) is a vehicle powered by a hydrogen-fueled internal combustion engine. Some versions are hydrogen–gasoline hybrids.

== 1800s ==
- 1807 – Francois Isaac de Rivaz – the De Rivaz engine, the first internal combustion engine using hydrogen as a fuel
- 1863 – Étienne Lenoir – Hippomobile

== BMW ==
- 2002 – BMW 750hL
- 2007 – Hydrogen 7 is powered by a dual-fuel internal combustion engine–liquid hydrogen
- 2007 – BMW H2R speed record car – ICE–liquid hydrogen

== CMB.TECH (Compagnie Maritime Belge) ==
- 2017 – Hydroville – a hydrogen internal combustion engine (dual-fuel) ferry
- 2021 – Dual Fuel Truck – a hydrogen internal combustion engine (dual-fuel) truck
- 2021 – Hydrobingo – a hydrogen internal combustion engine (dual-fuel) ferry
- 2022 – HydroTug – a hydrogen internal combustion engine (dual-fuel) tugboat

== Hydrogen Car Company ==
- Hydrogen Car Company hydrogen-converted Nissan Frontier
- Hydrogen Car Company hydrogen-converted Shelby Cobra

== Intergalactic Hydrogen ==
- Intergalactic Hydrogen hydrogen-converted Hummer

== Mini ==
- MINI Hatch/Cooper "CleanEnergy" is a running experimental concept car with a dual-fuel engine

== Mahindra & Mahindra ==
- Mahindra HyAlfa: a hydrogen internal combustion engine auto rickshaw

== Ford ==
- 2001 – Ford P2000 concept car using the Zetec 2.0L engine. (Note: Ford had several concept vehicles that used the P2000 designation.)
- 2006 – F-250 Super Chief a "Tri-Flex" engine concept pickup
- 2006 – Ford E-450 H2ICE Shuttle Bus a 12-passenger shuttle bus with a supercharged V10 fueled by compressed hydrogen

== Mazda ==
- 1991 – Mazda HR-X hydrogen Rotary
- 1993 – Mazda HR-X2 hydrogen Rotary
- 1993 – Mazda MX-5 Miata hydrogen Rotary
- 1995 – Mazda Capella, first public street test of the hydrogen Rotary engine
- 2003 – Mazda RX-8 Hydrogen RE hydrogen-gasoline hybrid Rotary
- 2005 – Mazda Premacy Hydrogen RE Hybrid
- 2007 – Mazda Hydrogen RE Plug in Hybrid

== Aston Martin ==
- Aston Martin, together with Alset GmbH, constructed the Aston Martin Hybrid Hydrogen Rapide S, a dual-fuel gasoline and hydrogen powered car used during 24H Nurburgring 2013

== Revolve (Acquired by CMB.TECH) ==
- 2010 – Ford Transit H2ICE

== Alpine ==
- 2022 Alpenglow Hy4

== Chevrolet ==
- 2010 Silverado

== Ronn Motor ==
- 2008 – Scorpion

== Tokyo City University ==
- 1974 – Musashi-1
- 1975 – Musashi-2
- 1977 – Musashi-3
- 1980 – Musashi-4
- 1982 – Musashi-5
- 1984 – Musashi-6
- 1986 – Musashi-7
- 1990 – Musashi-8
- 1994 – Musashi-9
- 1997 – Musashi-10

== Toyota ==
- 2021 – Modified Corolla Sport
- 2022 – Modified GR Yaris
- 2025 - Toyota GR LH2

== University of California, Riverside ==
- 1992 – Ford Ranger (Experimental Conversion)
- 2000 – Modified Shelby Cobra It achieved a respectable 108.16 mph, missing the world record for hydrogen powered vehicles by 0.1 mph.

== See also ==
- List of fuel cell vehicles
- List of production battery electric vehicles
- History of the internal combustion engine
- Timeline of hydrogen technologies
