= Mazda HR-X =

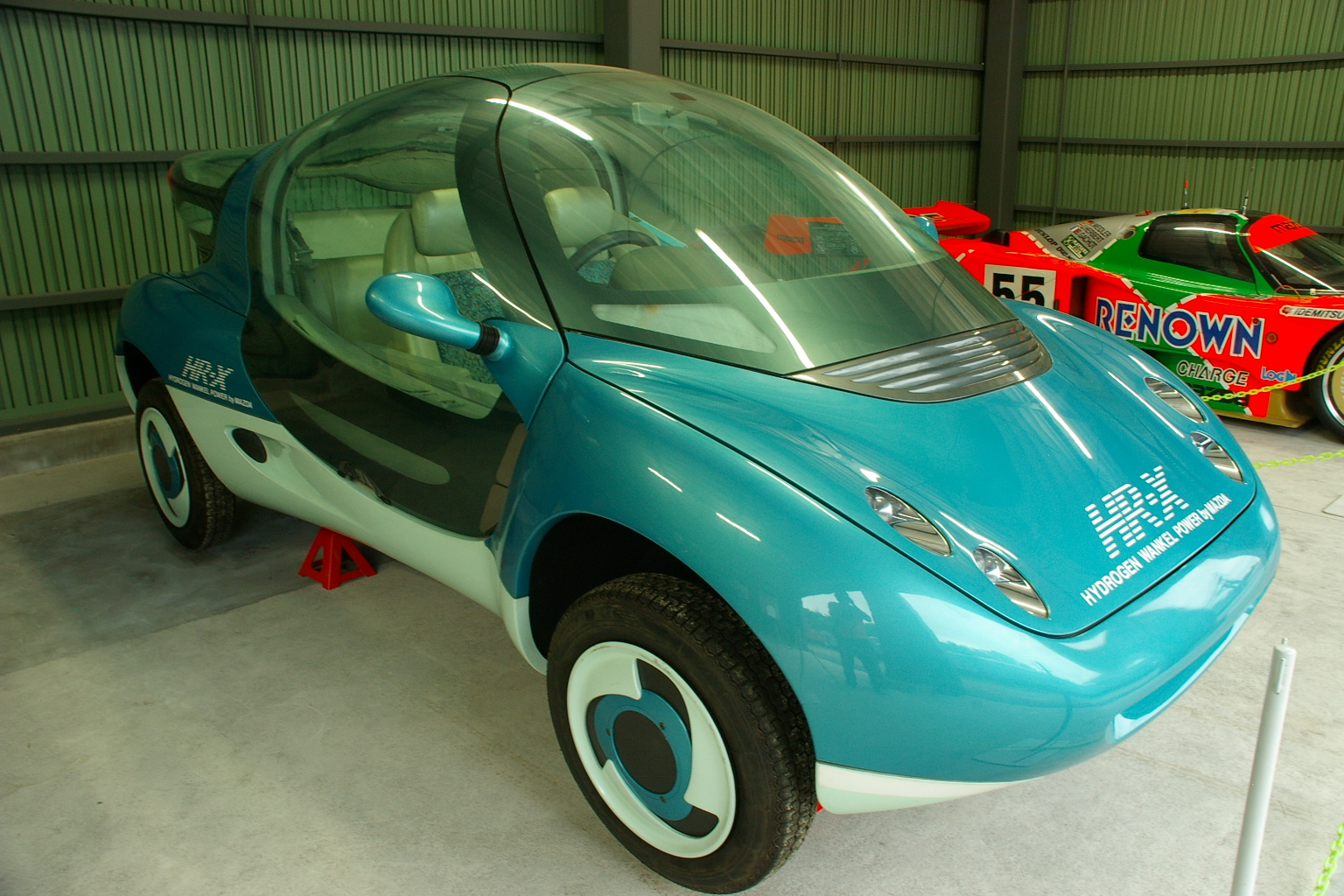
- Mazda HR-X in Otaru museum

Overview
- Manufacturer: Mazda
- Model years: 1991
- Assembly: Aki District, Hiroshima

Body and chassis
- Doors: Gullwing

Powertrain
- Engine: 2 rotor Mazda Wankel engine
- Transmission: 4-speed automatic
- Range: 190 km (120 mi)

Dimensions
- Length: 3,850 mm (151.6 in)
- Width: 1,700 mm (66.9 in)
- Height: 1,450 mm (57.1 in)
- Curb weight: 1,260 kg (2,778 lb)

Chronology
- Predecessor: None
- Successor: Mazda HR-X 2

The Mazda HR-X was the first hydrogen powered concept car produced by Mazda. The car was unveiled at the Tokyo Motor Show in 1991. The car seated four passengers in a plastic shell and was powered by a two rotor Wankel engine which propelled it to 130 km/h (81 mph). The hydrogen was stored in a cooled metal hydride tank and 3.32 kilograms (7.3 lb) provided a range of 190 km (120 mi). It was the first in a series of demonstration hydrogen internal combustion engine vehicles produced by Mazda.

== Design and development ==
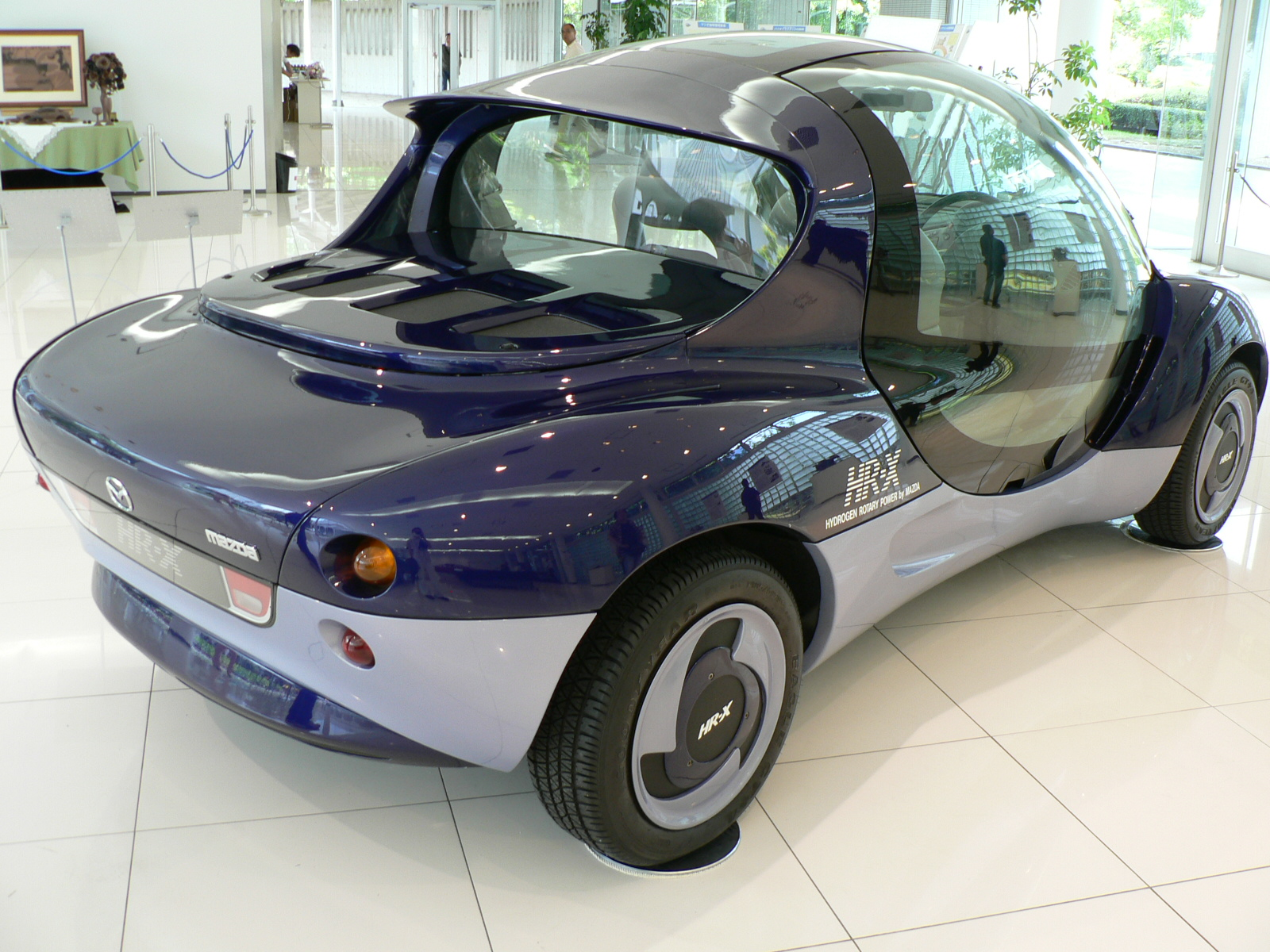
Rear view

The Mazda HR-X was a small concept car developed by Mazda at their plant in Aki District, Hiroshima to showcase the use of hydrogen fuel as a possible environmentally friendly alternative for automotive transport. The cabin accommodated four people who entered via gull-wing doors. It was constructed of plastic and designed to be nearly completely recyclable. The car was 3,850 mm (151.6 in) long and 1,700 mm (66.9 in) wide, with a maximum height of 1,450 mm (57.1 in). Weight was 1,260 kilograms (2,778 lb).

The car was powered by a two rotor Wankel engine that produced 100 hp (75 kW) mounted in the rear. The Wankel engine was chosen as it solved the backfiring problems that beset previous attempts to run hydrogen in combustion engines. 37 Nm3 (3.32 kg (7.3 lb)) of hydrogen was stored in a metal hydride tank that was refuelled by a single nozzle alongside water for cooling. The engine was connected to the wheels via a 4 speed automatic transmission, while a KERS-like system called Active Torque Control System (ACTS) was used to recover braking energy and reuse it to improve acceleration. The car was capable of a top speed of 130 km/h (81 mph) and had a range of 190 km (120 mi).

== Legacy ==
A single example of the HR-X was displayed at the Tokyo Motor Show in 1991 and then in New York in 1992. However, it was not ready for production and no more were produced afterwards. The car was superseded by the more conventional HR-X 2 a year later, the next in line of a number of Wankel-powered hydrogen-fuelled vehicles developed by Mazda. The lineage culminated in the RX-8 Hydrogen RE and Premacy Hydrogen RE Hybrid produced in small quantities in 2007.

== See also ==
- List of Mazda vehicles
- List of hydrogen internal combustion engine vehicles
