= Hydrogen internal combustion engine vehicle =

Vehicle with hydrogen internal combustion engine

Exhibits at Museum Autovision, Altlußheim, Germany

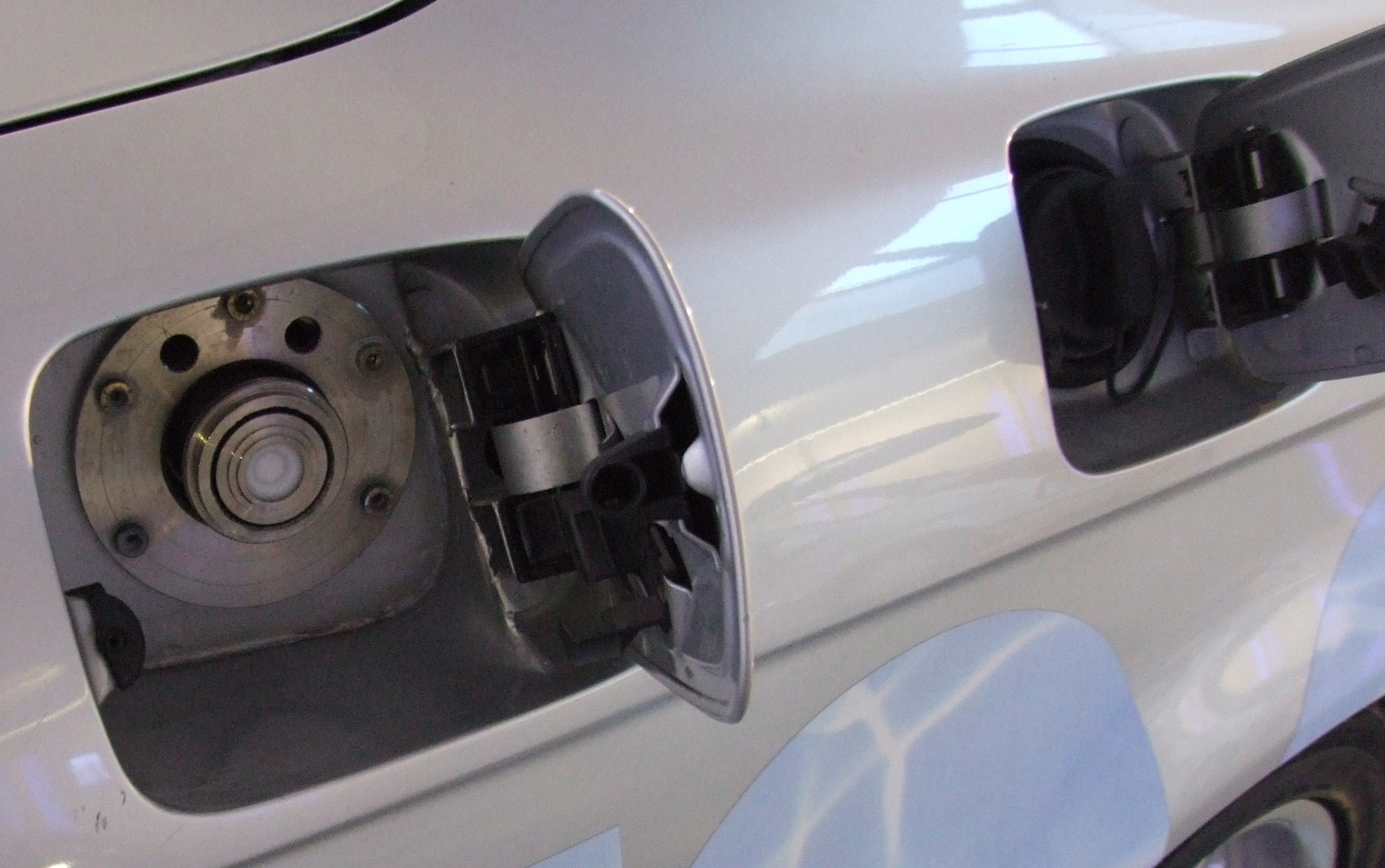
Filler neck for hydrogen of a BMW

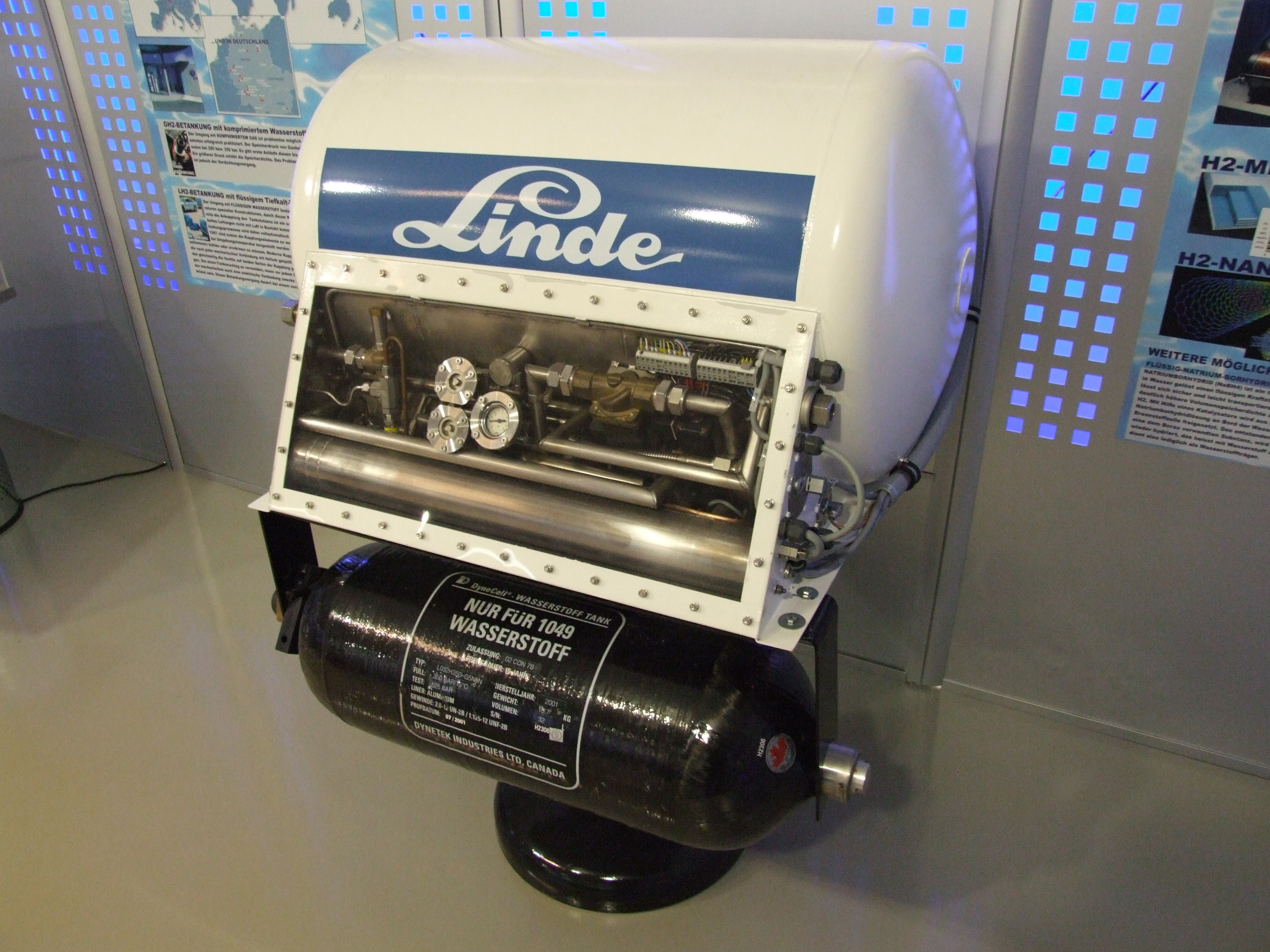
Liquid hydrogen tank by Linde plc

Hydrogen vehicles

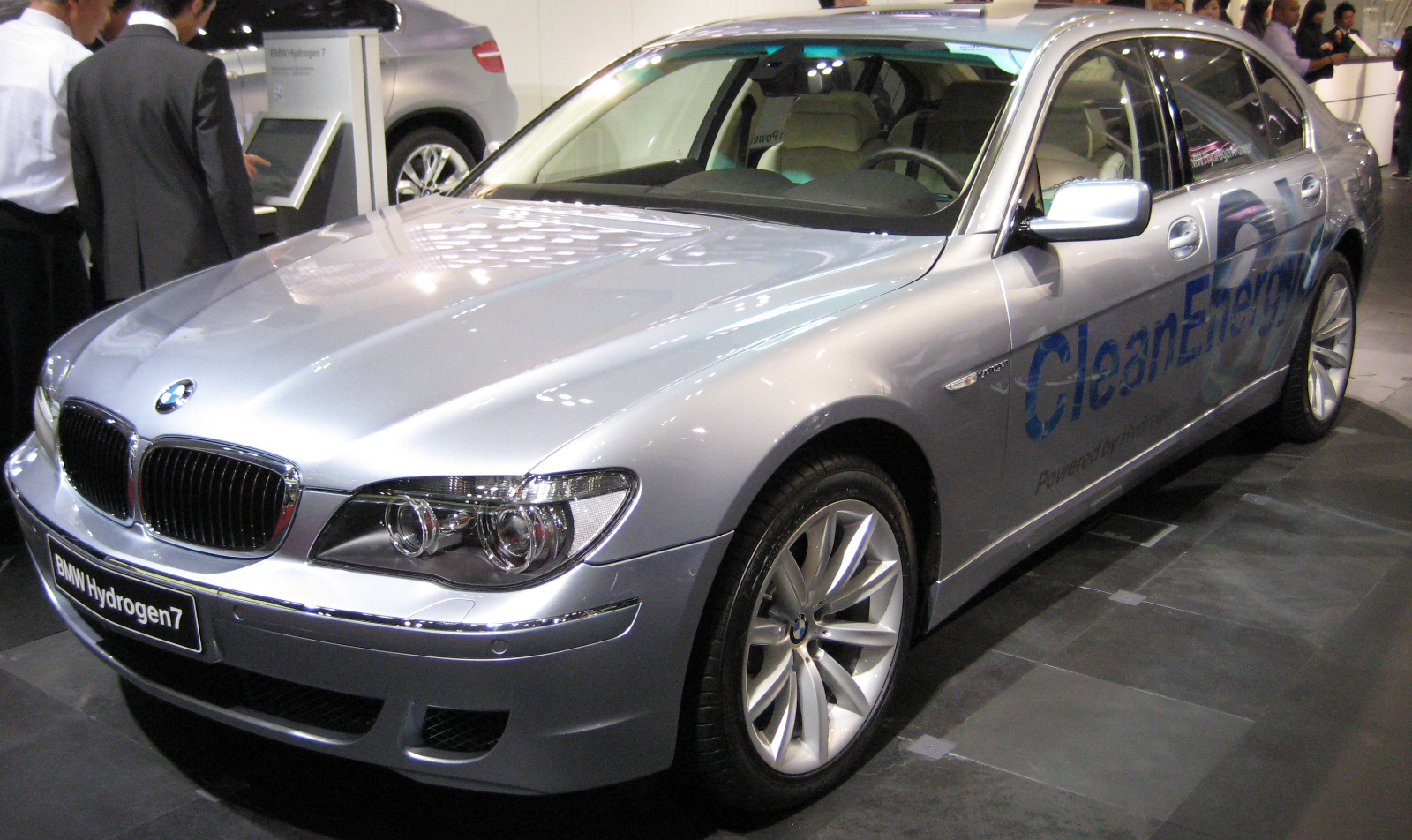
BMW Hydrogen 7 concept car

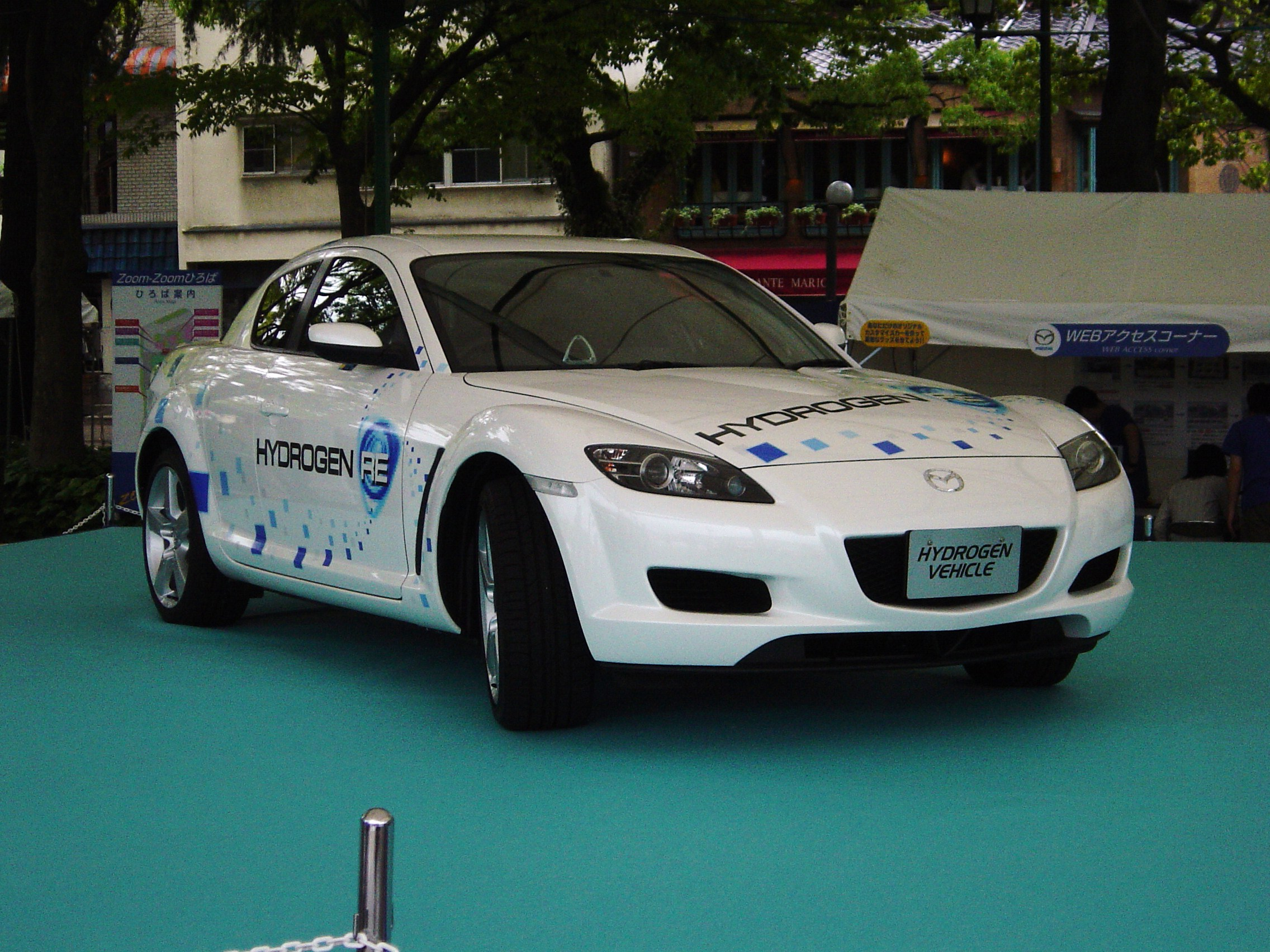
Mazda RX-8 Hydrogen RE (rotary engine)

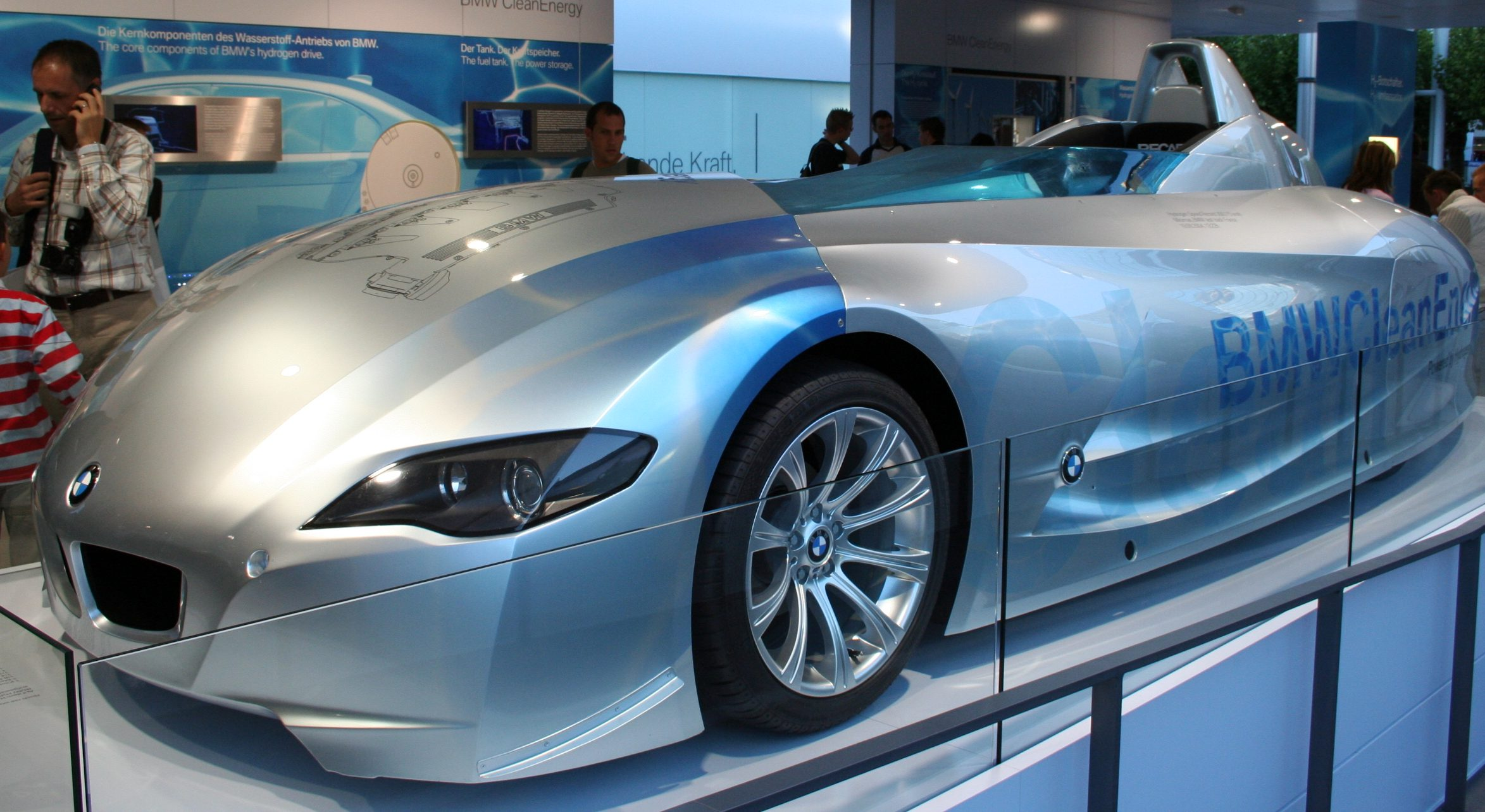
BMW H2R

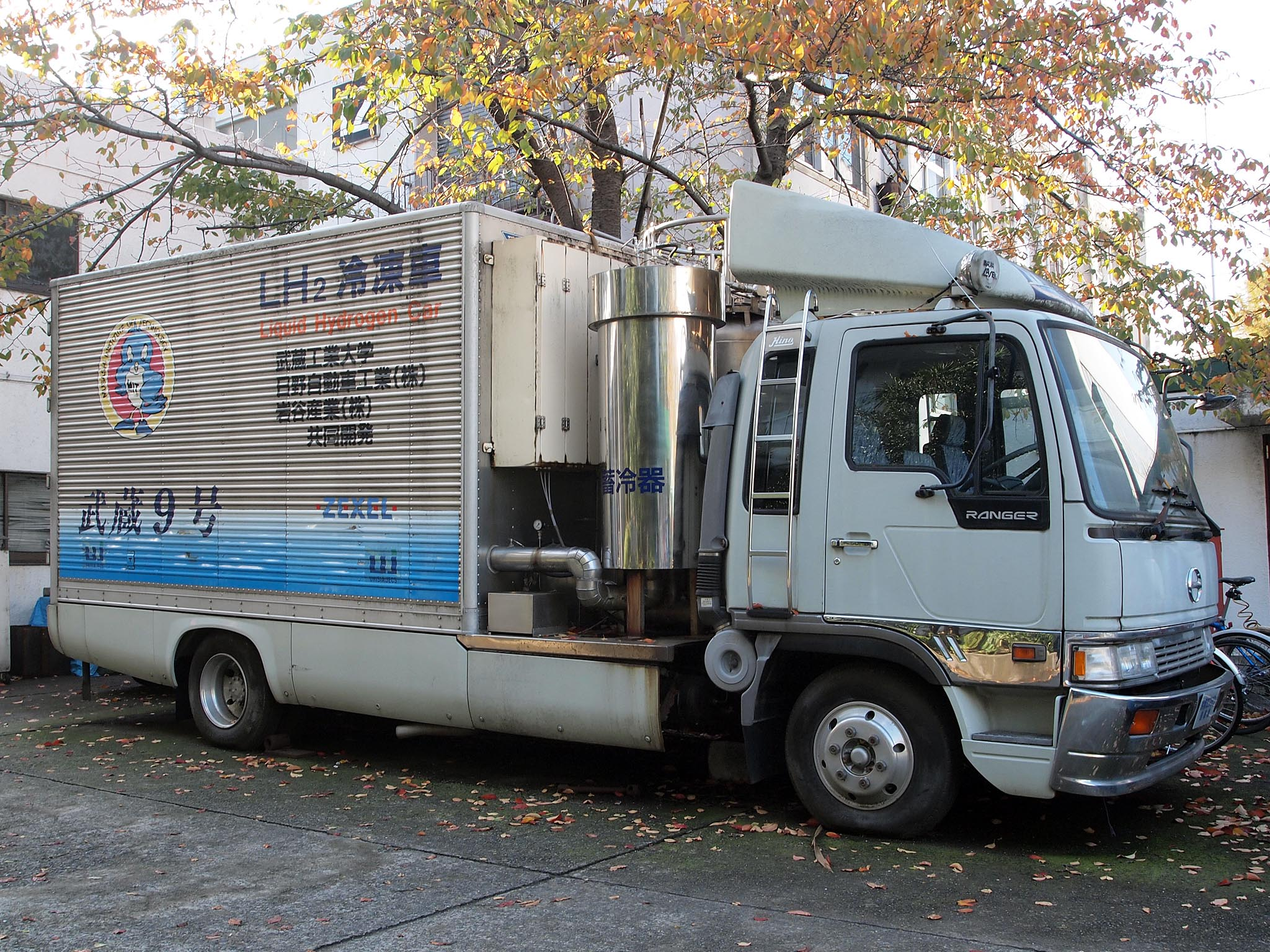
Musashi 9 Liquid hydrogen truck

A hydrogen internal combustion engine vehicle (HICEV) is a type of hydrogen vehicle using an internal combustion engine (ICE) that burns hydrogen fuel. Hydrogen internal combustion engine vehicles are different from hydrogen fuel cell vehicles (which utilize hydrogen electrochemically rather than through oxidative combustion). Instead, the hydrogen internal combustion engine is simply a modified version of the traditional gasoline-powered internal combustion engine. The absence of carbon in the fuel means that no CO_{2} is produced, which eliminates the main greenhouse gas emission of a conventional petroleum engine.

Pure hydrogen contains no carbon. Therefore, no carbon-based pollutants, such as carbon monoxide (CO), carbon dioxide (CO_{2}), or hydrocarbons (HC), occur in engine exhaust. However, hydrogen combustion occurs in an atmosphere containing nitrogen and oxygen, which can produce oxides of nitrogen (NO_{x}). In this respect, the combustion process is much like other high temperature combustion fuels, such as kerosene, gasoline, diesel, and natural gas. Therefore, hydrogen combustion engines are not considered zero emission.

== History ==
In 1806, Francois Isaac de Rivaz designed the De Rivaz engine, the first internal combustion engine, which ran on a hydrogen/oxygen mixture. Étienne Lenoir produced the Hippomobile in 1863. In 1970, Paul Dieges patented a modified gasoline ICE which can run on hydrogen.

Tokyo City University has been developing hydrogen ICEs since 1970. They have recently developed a hydrogen-fueled bus and a truck.

Mazda has developed Wankel engines that burn hydrogen. The advantage of using ICEs such as Wankel and piston engines is that the cost of retooling for production is much lower. Existing-technology ICEs can still be used in conditions where fuel cells are not a viable solution as yet, for example in cold-weather applications.

In 1990 an electric solar vehicle was converted to hydrogen using a 107 ml four-stroke engine. It was used in a research project which examined and measured losses from the power conversions sun → electricity → electrolysis → storage → motor → transmission → wheels. Compared to its previous battery-electric mode, the range proved higher but the system efficiency was lower, and the available alkaline hydrogen generator was too large to be carried on board. It was powered by a stationary solar installation, and the hydrogen produced was stored in pressurised bottles.

Between 2005 and 2007, BMW tested a luxury car named the BMW Hydrogen 7, powered by a hydrogen ICE, which achieved 301 km/h (187 mph) in tests. At least two of these concepts have been manufactured.

HICE forklift trucks have been demonstrated based on converted diesel internal combustion engines with direct injection.

Alset GmbH developed a hybrid hydrogen system that allows vehicle to use petrol and hydrogen fuels separately or at the same time with an ICE. This technology was used with Aston Martin Rapide S during the 24 Hours Nürburgring race. The Rapide S was the first vehicle to finish the race with hydrogen technology.

Hydrogen internal combustion engine development has been receiving more interest recently, particularly for heavy duty commercial vehicles. Part of the motivation for this is as a bridging technology to meet future climate CO_{2} emission goals, and as technology more compatible with existing automotive knowledge and manufacturing.

In September 2022, Kawasaki unveiled a hydrogen combustion engine developed using the same injector as the hydrogen Corolla, based on the Ninja H2.

In May 2023, Yamaha, Honda, Kawasaki and Suzuki received approval from Japan's Ministry of Economy, Trade and Industry (METI) to form a technological research association called HySE (Hydrogen Small mobility & Engine technology) to develop hydrogen-powered engines for small mobility.

== Records and motor sport ==
In the year 2000, a Shelby Cobra was converted to run on hydrogen in a project led by James W. Heffel (principal engineer at the time for the University of California, Riverside CE-CERT). The hydrogen conversion was done with the aim of making a vehicle capable of beating the current land speed record for hydrogen powered vehicles. It achieved a respectable 108.16 mph, missing the world record for hydrogen powered vehicles by 0.1 mph.

In May 2021, Toyota Corolla Sport, which is equipped with a hydrogen engine, entered the Super Taikyu Series race round 3 "NAPAC Fuji Super TEC 24 Hours", and completed the 24 hours race. Toyota intends to apply its safety technologies and know-how that it has accumulated through the development of fuel cell vehicles and the commercialization of the Mirai. In November 2021, five automotive manufacturers in Japan (Kawasaki Heavy Industries, Subaru, Toyota, Mazda and Yamaha Motor) jointly announced that they will take on the challenge of expanding fuel options through the use of internal combustion engines to achieve carbon neutrality, at the (three-hour) Super Taikyu race Round 6 held at Okayama International Circuit. Their common view is that the enemy is not internal combustion engines, and that diverse solutions toward challenging carbon neutrality are needed. At the event, Yamaha Motor unveiled a 5.0-liter V8 hydrogen engine which is based on Lexus 2UR engine.

In June 2022, Toyota revealed the progress of its efforts in the Super Taikyu Series at the ENEOS Super Taikyu Series 2022. They say cruising range was improved by approximately 20%, power output was improved by approximately 20% and torque was improved by approximately 30%. Also, hydrogen suppliers are added and its transporting became more efficient to support the race. In July 2022, Isuzu, Denso, Toyota, Hino Motors, and Commercial Japan Partnership Technologies Corporation (CJPT) announced that they have started planning and foundational research on hydrogen engines for heavy-duty commercial vehicles with the aim of further utilizing internal combustion engines as one option to achieve carbon neutrality.

In August 2022, Toyota conducted demonstration run of GR Yaris H2, a special hydrogen-engine version of Toyota GR Yaris, during the ninth round of the World Rally Championship (WRC) in Ypres.

In May 2023, Toyota Corolla Sport, which is equipped with a liquid hydrogen engine, entered the Super Taikyu Series race round 2 "NNAPAC Fuji SUPER TEC 24 Hours Race", and completed the 24 hours race. It was the first time that a car running on liquid hydrogen has entered a race anywhere in the world.

In June 2023, Toyota unveiled a hydrogen race car "GR H2 Racing Concept" built for 24 Hours of Le Mans.

In August 2026, driver Andy Green set a land speed record for hydrogen vehicles of 653.9 km/h (406.3 mph) on the Bonneville Salt Flats in a car built by equipment manufacturer JCB, which uses two hydrogen piston engines for propulsion.

== Efficiency ==
The thermal efficiency of an ideal Otto cycle depends on the compression ratio and improves from 47% to 56% when this is raised from 8 to 15. Engines in practical vehicles achieve 50-75% of this, with about 60% is suggested as an unlimited-cost limit. However, a conference presentation by Oak Ridge National Laboratory claims that the theoretical efficiency limit is 100%, based on it being an open cycle engine and therefore not limited by Carnot efficiency. In comparison, the efficiency of a fuel cell is limited by the Gibbs free energy, which is typically higher than that of Carnot. The determination of a fuel cell's performance depends on the thermodynamic evaluation. Using hydrogen's lower heating value, the maximum fuel cell efficiency would be 94.5%.

The efficiency of a hydrogen combustion engine can be similar to that of a traditional combustion engine. If well optimized, slightly higher efficiencies can be achieved. As compared with a hydrogen fuel cell, the fuel cell has a high efficiency peak at low load, while at high load the efficiency drops. The hydrogen combustion engine has a peak at high load and can achieve similar efficiency levels as a hydrogen fuel cell. From this, one can deduce that hydrogen combustion engines are a match in efficiency for fuel cells for heavy duty uses.

Efficiency decreases for small internal combustion engines. A 67 ml 4-stroke engine converted to hydrogen and tested with a dynamometer at the best operating point (3000 rpm, 14 NLM (normal liters per minute), 2.5 times stoichiometric air/fuel ratio) achieved 520 W and 21% efficiency. In order to measure the vehicular efficiency an also converted similar 107 ml engine (Honda GX110 with best gasoline efficiency 26%) was installed in a lightweight vehicle and driven up known gradients while measuring speed and hydrogen flow. Calculations gave as results 3.5% to 5.9% average efficiencies and 7.5% peak efficiency. The consumption measured on a level road was 24 NLM/km at a speed of 25 km/h and 31 NLM/km at 43 km/h.

== Pollutant emissions ==
The combustion of hydrogen with oxygen produces water vapor as its only product:

2H_{2} + O_{2} → 2H_{2}O

However, air is a mixture of gases, and the most abundant gas in air is nitrogen. Therefore, the combustion of hydrogen in air produces oxides of nitrogen, known as NO_{x}. In this respect, the combustion process is much like other high temperature combustion fuels, such as kerosene, gasoline, diesel or natural gas. This problem is exacerbated by the very high temperatures generated by the combustion of hydrogen. As such, hydrogen combustion engines are not considered zero emission.

At the end of 2021, almost 96% of the global hydrogen production was from natural gas (47%), coal (27%) and oil (22%) and only around 4% came from electrolysis. Emissions from burning hydrogen can be negligible, but emissions from producing hydrogen are currently higher than direct combustion of the source.

Hydrogen has a wide flammability range (3%–70% H_{2} in air) in comparison with other fuels. As a result, it can be combusted in an ICE over a wide range of fuel-air mixtures. An advantage of this is the engine can be run using a lean fuel-air mixture: i.e., one in which the amount of fuel is less than the theoretical, stoichiometric or chemically ideal amount needed for combustion with a given amount of air. Fuel economy is then greater and the combustion reaction is more complete. Also, the combustion temperature is usually lower, which reduces the amount of pollutants (e.g. nitrogen oxides) emitted.

The European emission standards measure emissions of carbon monoxide, hydrocarbon, non-methane hydrocarbons, nitrogen oxides (NO_{x}), atmospheric particulate matter, and particle numbers.

As with any internal combustion engine, small amounts of the engine oil needed for lubrication can enter the combustion chamber, and take part in the combustion process. The exhaust gases can therefore contain small amounts of the products of combustion of this oil. Typically very minute quantities of CO, CO_{2}, SO_{2}, HC and particulates can be found in the exhaust gases. These are several orders of magnitude lower than what would be seen in the exhaust gases of a gasoline or diesel engine.

Tuning a hydrogen engine in 1976 to produce the greatest amount of emissions possible resulted in emissions comparable with consumer operated gasoline engines from that period. More modern engines however often come equipped with exhaust gas recirculation (EGR). Generalized equation when ignoring EGR:

2H_{2} + (x+1)O_{2} + N_{2} → 2H_{2}O + 2NO_{x}

This technology potentially benefits hydrogen combustion also for NO_{x} emissions.

Since hydrogen combustion is not zero emission but has zero CO_{2} emissions, it is attractive to consider hydrogen ICEs as part of a hybrid powertrain. In this configuration, the vehicle can offer short-term zero emission capabilities, such as operating in city zero emission zones.

== Adaptation of existing engines ==
The differences between a hydrogen ICE and a traditional gasoline engine include hardened valves and valve seats, stronger connecting rods, non-platinum tipped spark plugs, a higher voltage ignition coil, fuel injectors designed for a gas instead of a liquid, larger crankshaft damper, stronger head gasket material, modified (for supercharger) intake manifold, positive pressure supercharger, and high temperature engine oil. All modifications would amount to about one point five times (1.5) the current cost of a gasoline engine. These hydrogen engines burn fuel in the same manner that gasoline engines do.

The theoretical maximum power output from a hydrogen engine depends on the air/fuel ratio and fuel injection method used. The stoichiometric air/fuel ratio for hydrogen is 34:1. At this air/fuel ratio, hydrogen will displace 29% of the combustion chamber leaving only 71% for the air. As a result, the energy content of this mixture will be less than it would be if the fuel were gasoline. Since both the carbureted and port injection methods mix the fuel and air prior to it entering the combustion chamber, these systems limit the maximum theoretical power obtainable to approximately 85% of that of gasoline engines. For direct injection systems, which mix the fuel with the air after the intake valve has closed (and thus the combustion chamber has 100% air), the maximum output of the engine can be approximately 15% higher than that for gasoline engines.

Therefore, depending on how the fuel is metered, the maximum output for a hydrogen engine can be either 15% higher or 15% less than that of gasoline if a stoichiometric air/fuel ratio is used. However, at a stoichiometric air/fuel ratio, the combustion temperature is very high and as a result it will form a large amount of nitrogen oxides (NO_{x}), which is a criteria pollutant. Since one of the reasons for using hydrogen is low exhaust emissions, hydrogen engines are not normally designed to run at a stoichiometric air/fuel ratio.

Typically hydrogen engines are designed to use about twice as much air as theoretically required for complete combustion. At this air/fuel ratio, the formation of NO_{x} is reduced to near zero. Unfortunately, this also reduces the power output to about half that of a similarly sized gasoline engine. To make up for the power loss, hydrogen engines are usually larger than gasoline engines, and/or are equipped with turbochargers or superchargers. A small amount of hydrogen can be burned outside the combustion chamber and reach into the air/fuel mixture in the chamber to ignite the main combustion.

In the Netherlands, research organisation TNO has been working with industrial partners on developing hydrogen internal combustion engines.

In Australia, the engineers further insert fit diesel ICE into run hydrogen fuel for car and truck.

== See also ==
- Bi-fuel vehicle
- Classic car fuel conversions
- Fuel gas-powered scooter
- Formic acid
- Hydrogen fuel enhancement
- Home hydrogen fueling station
- Liquid nitrogen vehicle
- List of hydrogen internal combustion engine vehicles
- Phase-out of fossil fuel vehicles
- Timeline of hydrogen technologies
