= Alset GmbH =

Austrian engineering company

- Type: GmbH
- Industry: Automotive Industry
- Founded: 2005
- Headquarters: Graz, Austria
- Key people: Jose Ignacio Galindo (CEO)
- Products: Hybrid Hydrogen

Alset Global GmbH is an Austrian technology and engineering company based in Graz that specialises in hydrogen-based clean mobility products. Alset Global is known for developing a Hybrid Hydrogen internal combustion engine that can run on either pure petrol, pure hydrogen or a combination of both. This technology offers a sustainable and clean alternative to petrol-based internal combustion engines. The technology has been developed to create an alternative technology to meet new emission target levels. Alset Global also specialises in hydrogen system integration, hydrogen gas storage, and software development.

Alset's Hybrid Hydrogen technology was featured on an Aston Martin Rapide S during the Nürburgring 24-Hour race in Germany. The Aston Martin Rapide S became the first hydrogen-powered car to compete in a 24-hour race and generate zero CO_{2} emissions during an international motor race.

== Product ==
=== Hybrid Hydrogen ===
Alset Global emphasises the importance of hydrogen technology for sustainable mobility. The main argument for hydrogen usage is its renewable energy attribute and the fact that it does not pollute the environment. These reasons have elevated the importance of hydrogen technology in the automotive industry, which has been trying to cope with tight emission regulations due to the threat of climate change. Combustion of hydrogen in internal combustion engines was first designed by French inventor Francois Isaac de Rivaz in 1807. His design of a hydrogen-burning internal combustion engine is called de Rivaz. His design was very simple but never transferred to mass production.

The Hydrogen Hybrid technology developed by Alset Global enables the automotive industry to transform existing internal combustion engines into hybrid hydrogen engines. Through the Hydrogen Hybrid technology, the existing internal combustion vehicles are able to reduce their CO_{2} emission levels to zero and consume a renewable energy resource.

One advantage of implementing a Hydrogen Hybrid technology is that the installation is cost-efficient and practical. The eight years of research and development that have been conducted and tested in the Nürburgring race among other tests have proven that it is easy to incorporate the hydrogen technology.

==== Hybrid Hydrogen System ====
The Hybrid Hydrogen system runs parallel to a conventional petrol injection system. Alset Global designed this architecture so that it can be installed in any vehicle with minimum modification to the existing system. The shift between the petrol and the hydrogen is achieved by the software developed by Alset Global. This software controls the ECU of the vehicle and shifts between the petrol and hydrogen fuels. The software ensures that the vehicle's benefits from the hydrogen are at its maximum level without risking the journey to run out of hydrogen or petrol fuels. The main reasoning behind this system is to make drivers comfortable with the range of hydrogen and ensure them that petrol fuel can be supplied to the system at any time. Until the infrastructure for hydrogen filling stations is totally established, Alset Global's fuel switch system will increase the confidence and serenity of drivers who wish to make long road trips.

==== Unique Character ====
The unique characteristic of the Hydrogen Hybrid system is the flexibility to use both petrol and hydrogen fuel depending on the driving conditions. The other hydrogen systems for internal combustion engines that have been developed by other automobile companies are not capable of using both petrol and hydrogen fuel at the same time. Hence, this characteristic of the Hydrogen Hybrid system differentiates Alset Global from the others. Eight years of research and development have led to a very efficient way to burn hydrogen and use the fuel's full potential. Nevertheless, the details of this technology are not revealed to the public. Alset Global holds various patents for the future implications of this system and therefore the information is concealed.

==== Idea Behind the Technology ====
Alset Global developed this technology after identifying a gap in the hydrogen market. Indeed, hydrogen fuel cell technology is expensive to develop, and a hydrogen infrastructure has not been established yet. Because the fuel cell technology is limited to hydrogen, it cannot be mass-produced without adequate infrastructure. Furthermore, even if the infrastructure was to be fully established, the existing conventional vehicles running on internal combustion engines would not be able to benefit from the zero-emission hydrogen technology. Today, internal combustion engines represent 99.9% of the market. Therefore, Alset Global's alternative system is needed to transform and improve conventional vehicles and ultimately benefit the automotive industry from the developing hydrogen infrastructure.

==== Driving Experience ====
Alset Global conducted a special test drive in Graz for the Hydrogen Hybrid technology. Based on feedback from individuals who drove using this technology, running on a mixture of hydrogen and petrol compared to running on petrol alone was not significantly different. As the system works with the same principle as the petrol internal combustion engine, the driving experience does not alter due to an alternative fuel. Indeed, Alset mentioned that the engine sound is nearly the same as the petrol engine. Therefore, unlike other alternative fuel technologies, automotive makers do not have to provide artificial engine noise for the drivers.

==== Driving Safety ====
The Hydrogen Hybrid system is as safe as traditional petrol-powered engines, according to Alset Global. They stress that the hydrogen tank is designed to offer the same level of safety as petrol-powered vehicles, with no or little risk. Indeed, ultra-high-strength fibre tanks ensure the safety of hydrogen fuel. Alset Global has proven the complete safety of its system through the safety requirements met at Nürburgring's 24-hour Race. This race is considered as one of the toughest technical challenges race cars can face in the world. In addition, hydrogen is known to be as much as four times more diffusive than natural gas. This means that if hydrogen gas is leaking, it will quickly go up in the atmosphere. Furthermore, when hydrogen burns, its radiant heat is just one-tenth that of a hydrocarbon fire. Finally, hydrogen burns 7 per cent cooler than gasoline, reducing heat losses.

== Aston Martin Rapide S ==
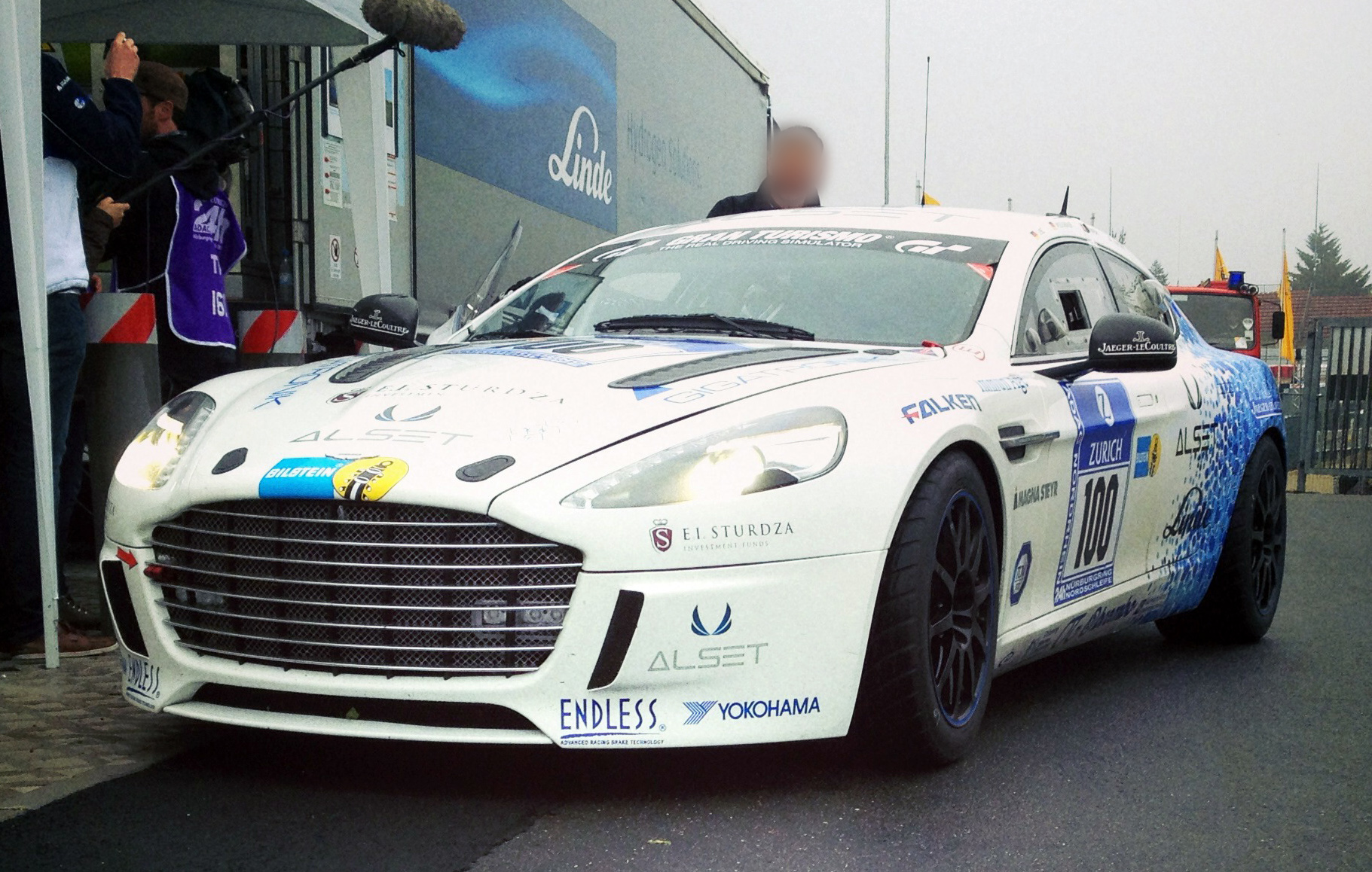
Long distance hydrogen-powered racer

Aston Martin and Alset Global developed a Rapide S four-door, four-seat model to become the first hydrogen car to race on the 41st ADAC Zurich 24-hour Nürburgring race. The hydrogen-powered Aston Martin Rapide S uses the same original internal combustion petrol engine. However, necessary revisions were made to the engine so that it could run on both hydrogen fuel and petrol fuel. At the race, this vehicle produced 500 PS (368 kW; 493 hp) of power and achieved 0 to 100 km/h (62 mph) in 4.9 seconds. In addition, this vehicle achieved 22 km of lap during the race without emitting any CO_{2} emissions.

The engine of the Aston Martin Rapide S used for the Hydrogen Hybrid application was a twin-turbocharged 6-litre V12 engine that can generate 550 PS (405 kW) and reach a top speed of 306 km/h (190 mph). It competed in the experimental E1-XP2 class.

The Aston Martin Rapide S powered by Alset Hydrogen Hybrid technology managed to reach an average speed of 255 km/h (158 mph) during the 24-hour Nürburgring race and finished in 113th. The hydrogen pit stop was estimated to take 45 seconds, however during the race the engineers managed to reduce the pit stop time to 30 seconds.

== Future of Alset ==
For the future, Alset Global is focused on three different areas: SUVs and luxury vehicles, motorsports and commercial vehicles. The technology introduced by Alset Global is capable of reducing the CO_{2} emissions for SUVs and luxury vehicles without any compromise to the pleasure of driving with the sound and torque of an engine. The area of motorsports has already begun with Aston Martin's Rapide S. The last area is commercial vehicles. Commercial vehicles are responsible for large amounts of CO_{2} emissions; and therefore, Alset can have an important impact in that area. Alset Global plans to extend its technology to engage with commercial vehicles.

=== London Hydrogen Project ===
The London Hydrogen Project started in 2002 and initiated projects with more than £50 million. The Hydrogen Project is especially concentrated on hydrogen taxis, buses, scooters, refuelling stations, and various other projects to enable hydrogen mobility.

== Award ==
Alset Global won the Powertrain of the Year Award at the Professional Motorsport World (PMW) Expo 2013 Awards in Cologne, Germany. The award was given to Alset's new powertrain technology applied in Aston Martin's Rapide S, which enables the use of both hydrogen and petrol in an internal combustion engine. This technology was used in Aston Martin's Rapide S during the Nürburgring 24 Hours race.
