= Raymond Freymann =

Luxembourgish inventor (born 1952)

Raymond Freymann is an engineering professor and researcher, born on 30 May 1952 in Esch-sur-Alzette, Luxembourg, and has authored or co-authored more than 150 scientific publications. He has served BMW for 25 years and held the position of CEO of BMW Group Research and Technology from 2003 to 2011

== Biography ==
Raymond Freymann graduated in 1970 from the Lycée de Garcons in Esch-sur Alzette, Luxembourg. He performed his study in mechanical engineering at the Technical University of Braunschweig in Germany. He got his engineering degree in 1976 with a major in aerospace technologies. He obtained his doctor of engineering degree from the Technical University of Braunschweig in 1981 for the work he has performed at the Institute of Aeroelasticity at the DLR in Göttingen (Germany). Subsequently, he has been working as a scientist at the Flight Dynamics Laboratory at Wright Patterson Air Force Base in Dayton (Ohio). His career at BMW Group started in 1986 as head of the structural dynamics and acoustics division at the BMW Development and Innovation Center in Munich (Germany). Later he was appointed as director of the Vehicle Physics department and was nominated director of Vehicle Research in 2000. From 2003 to 2011 he was acting as CEO of BMW Group Research and Technology (BMW Forschung und Technik GmbH).

Raymond Freymann acquired his habilitation from the Technical University of Munich in 2000 and was nominated as honorary professor at the Technical University of Munich in 2002.

Raymond Freymann served in a variety of scientific and advisory committees, such as the NATO Advisory Group for Aerospace Research and Development (AGARD) from 1981 to 1996, the American Institute of Aeronautics and Astronautics (AIAA) from 1987 to 1991, the Society of Automotive Engineers (SAE) from 1998 to 2001, the British Institution of Mechanical Engineers (ImechE) from 1997 to 2002, the Feldafinger Kreis in Germany from 2008 to 2011, the Comité Supérieur de la Recherche et de l´Innovation (CSRI) in Luxembourg from 2008 to 2011. From 2015 to 2019 he was acting as chairman of the supervisory board of EIT Digital, a Knowledge and Innovation Community (KIC) of the European Institute of Technology (EIT). Since 2019 he is supporting the Gesellschaft zur Förderung des Technologietransfers (GFFT) in Germany as an honorary member.

== Technical achievements ==
Major technical accomplishments were the many contributions to advanced aeroelastically optimized and actively controlled aircraft configurations, the development of an actively damped aircraft landing gear system in 1985, a novel approach for derivation of the generalized equations of motion of coupled structural-acoustic systems in 1992 forming the basis of the commercial software code CDH-VAO, the pioneering and development of the Holographic Modal Analysis testing tool (HOLOMODAL) in 1994, the development of a waste heat recovery systems for internal combustion engines (BMW Turbosteamer) in 2000, the development of the hydrogen speed record vehicle BMW H2R in 2004, the visionary approach for the future deployment of a hydrogen based energy supply economy making use of liquid organic hydrides (LOHC) as a fuel (in 2005).

== Publications ==
Dr. Freymann has authored or co-authored more than 150 scientific publications in the technical fields of aeroelasticity, active control systems, structural dynamics, servo-hydraulics, testing and instrumentation, acoustics, hydrogen technology (CleanEnergy), energy management (EfficientDynamics), human-machine-interface, driver assistance and active safety (ConnectedDrive).

A Method for Determining the Aeroelastic Behavior of Aircraft with Active Control Systems. European Space Agency Technical Translation, ESA-TT-719, 1982. Doctor Thesis.

Advanced Numerical and Experimental Methods in the Field of Vehicle Structural Acoustics. Hieronymus München, 2000, ISBN 3-89791-172-8, Habilitation Thesis.

Holographic Modal Analysis, Laser in Research and Engineering, Springer Verlag Berlin, pp. 530–542, 1996

Strukturdynamik – Ein anwendungsorientiertes Lehrbuch (Structural Dynamics – An Application Oriented Textbook). Springer Verlag, 2011, ISBN 978-3-642-19697-3. Lecture course given at the Technical University of Munich.

Dynamic Interactions Between Active Control Systems and a Flexible Aircraft Structure. AIAA CP 864(1986), pp. 517–524; Journal of Guidance, Control, and Dynamics, Vol. 10, Nr. 5 (1987), pp. 447–452; Aeronautika Technika, UDSSR, July 1988, pp. 92–99.

An Active Control Landing Gear for the Alleviation of Aircraft Taxi Ground Loads. Zeitschrift für Flugwissenschaften und Weltraumforschung, ZFW 11 (1987), Band 2, pp. 97–105.

An Energetic Approach for Derivation of the Generalized Equations of Motion of Coupled Structural-Acoustic Systems. AIAA CP 942 (1994), pp. 1868–1880.

The Turbosteamer: A System Introducing the Principle of Cogeneration in Automotive Applications. Motortechnische Zeitschrift, MTZ 05/2008, Jahrgang 69, pp. 404–412.

Potentiale von alternativen Wasserstofftechnologien. VDI-Berichte: Innovative Fahrzeugantriebe, 2008, Vol. 2030, pp. 273–298.
