= Zero Emission Resource Organisation =

Norwegian environmental organisation

- Type: Foundation
- Industry: Environmentalism
- Founded: 2002
- Headquarters: Oslo, Norway
- Area served: Norway
- Key people: Espen Espeset (Chairman); Marius Holm (Director)
- Number of employees: Approx. 25
- Website: www.zero.no

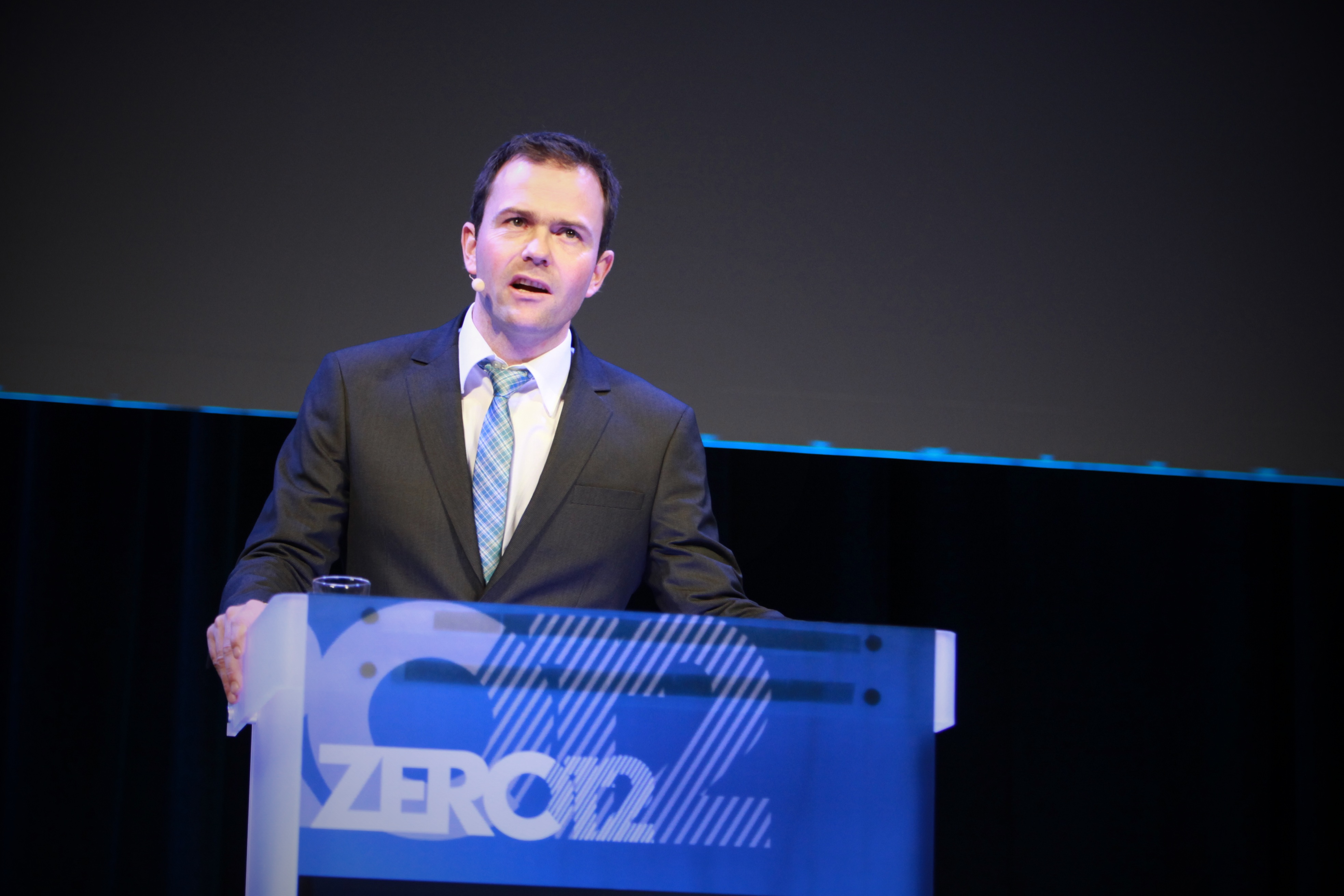
Director Marius Holm

Zero Emission Resource Organisation or ZERO is a Norwegian environmental organisation that was founded in 2002 to work on the reduction of greenhouse gases, primarily in Norway. The philosophy of the organisation is that if new facilities are made emission-free, then when existing plants and methods are phased out due to old age and outdated technology, society is left with emission-free facilities. The primary working areas include CO_{2} disposal, renewable energy, especially wind power, and new transportation fuels, including hydrogen and biofuel. ZERO is organised as a foundation and was started by former activists and employees of Natur og Ungdom and Bellona. Funding sources include industrial associations and companies. ZERO is led by Marius Holm (director) and Erik Espeset (chairman).

== Issues ==
ZERO promotes new technology that enables emission-free energy solutions without harming the environment. Important issues are electric cars and chargers, carbon capture and storage (CCS), renewable energy, electrification of offshore installations, climate-friendly construction and buildings and fossil-free plastic. It also promotes biofuel as an alternative to fossil fuels.

ZERO worked to establish an electricity certificate scheme to promote renewable energy in Norway and Sweden. The organisation also supported Hynor—A chain of hydrogen fuel stations that would span the South Coast from Oslo to Stavanger. It promotes CO_{2}-capture and storage from industrial plants and other industrial emission reductions and is a supporter of windmills.

The organisation receives financial support from a wide range of public and private donors. Among others, the partners include Elkem, Siemens, Coca-Cola Norway, Scatec Solar, Tesla and Statoil.

== The Zero conference ==
The biggest event is the annual ZERO conference (Zero-konferansen), that takes place in Oslo, Norway every November. The conference, established in 2006, is the largest climate conference in Norway with more than 1000 attendants. Arnold Schwarzenegger, Kofi Annan, Jens Stoltenberg, Chelsea Clinton and former chairman of the IPCC Rajendra K. Pachauri have all been speakers at the conference.
