= Pyréolophore =

Early internal combustion engine

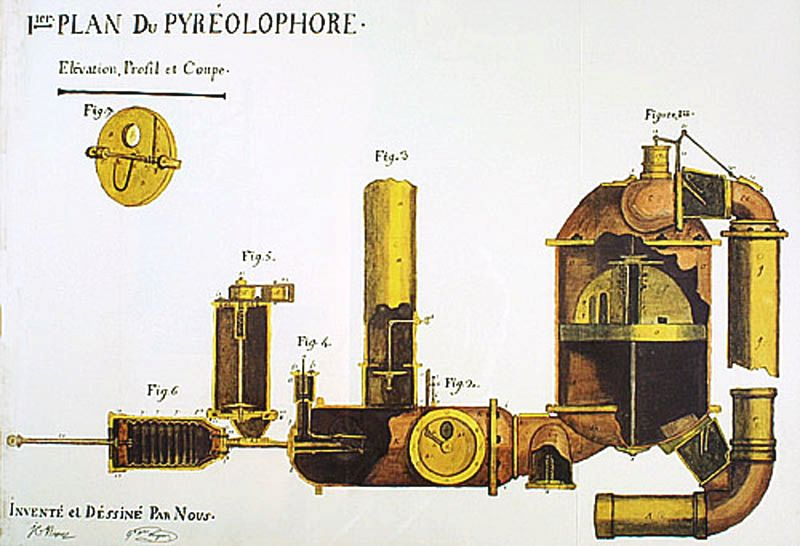
1806 diagram of the Pyréolophore, drawn by the Niépce brothers

Pyréolophore
Ou nouvelle Machine dont le principe moteur est l'air dilaté par le feu.
(Pyréolophore, or new Machine whose driving principle is air dilated by fire.)

— The patent application written by the Niépce brothers in 1807 and granted by Napoleon Bonaparte on 20 July 1807

The Pyréolophore (Note: from Ancient Greek πῦρ (pŷr) 'fire', Αἴολος (Aíolos) 'wind' and -φόρος (-phóros) 'bearer') (French: [piʁeɔlɔfɔʁ]) was an early internal combustion engine and the first made to power a boat. It was invented in the early 19th century in Chalon-sur-Saône, France, by the Niépce brothers: Nicéphore (who went on to invent photography) and Claude. In 1807 the brothers ran a prototype internal combustion engine, and on 20 July 1807 a patent was granted by Napoleon Bonaparte after it had successfully powered a boat upstream on the river Saône.

The Pyréolophore ran on what were believed to be "controlled dust explosions" of various experimental fuels. The fuels included mixtures of lycopodium powder (the spores of Lycopodium, or clubmoss), finely crushed coal dust, and resin.

Operating independently, in 1807 the Swiss engineer François Isaac de Rivaz built the de Rivaz engine, a hydrogen-powered internal combustion engine. These practical engineering projects may have followed the 1680 theoretical design of an internal combustion engine by the Dutch scientist Christiaan Huygens. The separate, virtually contemporaneous implementations of this design in different modes of transport means that the de Rivaz engine may be correctly described as the first use of an internal combustion engine in an automobile (1808), whilst the Pyréolophore was the first use of an internal combustion engine in a boat (1807).

== Preliminary research ==
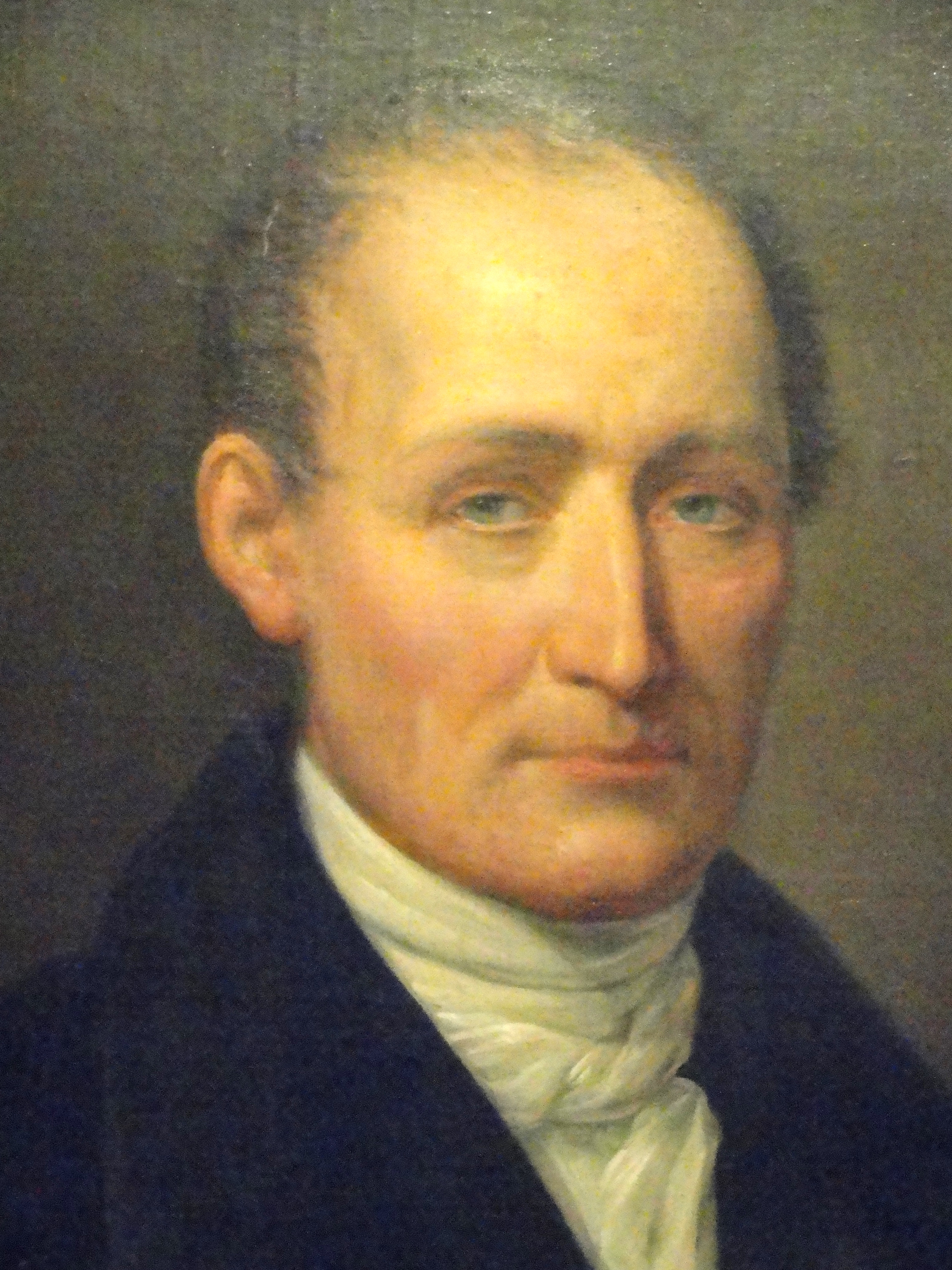
Nicéphore Niépce

The Niépce brothers were living in Nice when they conceived of a project to create an engine based on the newly defined principle of hot air expanding during an explosion; their challenge was to find a way to harness the energy released in a series of explosions.

In 1806 the Niépce brothers presented a paper on their research to the French National Commission of the Academy of Science (French: Institute National de Science). The commission's verdict was:

The fuel ordinarily used by MM. Niépce is made of lycopodium spores, the combustion of which is the most intense and the easiest; however this material being costly, they replaced it with pulverized coal and mixed it if necessary with a small portion of resin, which works very well, as was proved by many experiments. In MM. Niépces' machine no portion of heat is dispersed in advance; the moving force is an instantaneous result, and all the fuel effect is used to produce the dilatation that causes the moving force.

— Lazare Carnot and C. L. Berthollet, Report for the National Commission of the Academy of Science, 15 December 1806

== Proof of concept ==
In 1807 the brothers constructed a prototype internal combustion engine and received a patent for ten years from the Bureau of Arts and Trades (French: Bureau des Arts et Métiers) in Paris. The patent was signed by Emperor Napoleon Bonaparte and dated 20 July 1807, the same year that Swiss engineer François Isaac de Rivaz constructed a hydrogen-powered internal combustion engine. It is not clear how much these practical engineering projects owe to the theoretical designs of 1680 by the Dutch scientist Christiaan Huygens.

The Pyréolophore ran on controlled dust explosions of various experimental fuels, including various mixtures of finely crushed coal dust, Lycopodium powder, and resin. De Rivaz, meanwhile, was using a mixture of hydrogen and oxygen.

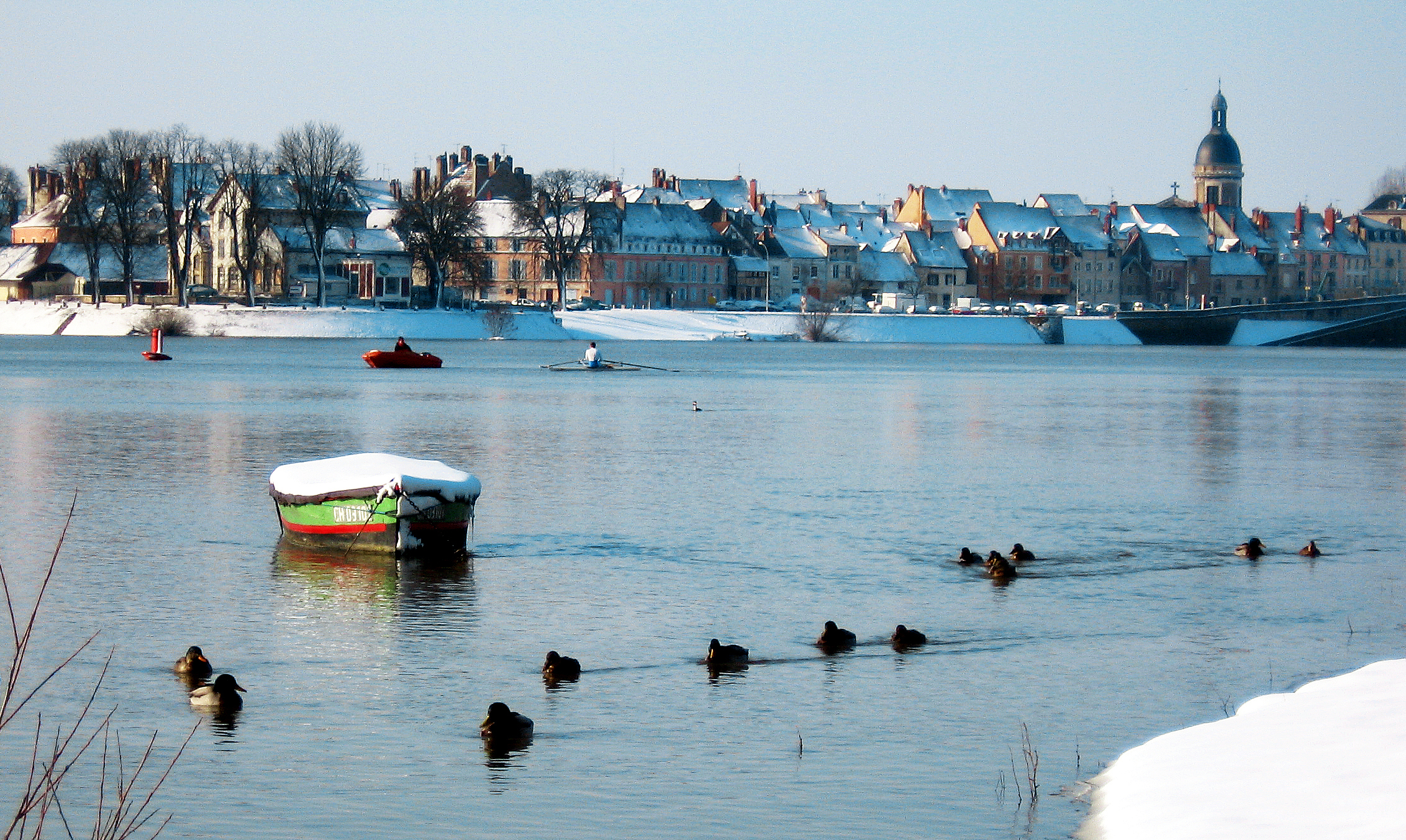
River Saône at Chalon, site of the first trials of the Pyréolophore in 1807

To prove the utility of the Pyréolophore to the patent commission, the brothers installed it on a boat, which it powered upstream on the river Saône. The total weight was 9 quintals, about 900 kg (2,000 lb), fuel consumption was reported as "one hundred and twenty-five grains per minute" (about 125 grains or 8 grams per minute), and the performance was 12–13 explosions per minute. The boat was propelled forward as the Pyréolophore sucked in the river water at the front and then pumped it out toward the rear. Thus, the Commissioners concluded that "the machine proposed under the name Pyreolophore by MM. Niépce is ingenious, that it may become very interesting by its physical and economical results, and deserves the approbation of the Commission."

== Operation ==
The operation of the Pyréolophore was first described in a meeting at the Academy of Sciences on 15 December 1806. Lazare Carnot noted that "there was a bright flash of the 'spores of lycopodium' inside their sealed copper machine... The Niépce brothers, by their own device and without using water, have managed to create a commotion (explosion) in a confined space which is so strong that the effects appear to be comparable to a steam engine or fire pump".

The Pyréolophore operated as a series of discrete burns at a frequency of about 12 per minute to power a boat. Power was delivered in pulses, each pulse forcing water from the engine's tail pipe set under the boat and pointing toward its stern. The boat was pushed forward at each pulse by the reactive force of the ejected mass of water.

A Pyréolophore engine consists of two principal interconnected chambers: a firelighting chamber and a combustion chamber. There is also a bellows for injecting air, a fuel dispenser, an ignition device, and a submerged exhaust pipe. There is a means of storing energy at each explosion in order to work the mechanism as it prepares itself for the next cycle.

A mechanically operated bellows injects a jet of air into the first chamber where ignition will take place. Mechanical timing lets fall a measured amount of powder fuel into the jet so that it is blown along and mixed with it. Under the control of the mechanical timing mechanism a smoldering fuse is introduced to this fuel air jet at the precise moment it passes the fuse location. The fuse then withdraws behind a metal plate. The now burning ball of powder and air travels through a wide nozzle into the main combustion chamber where a fast, almost explosive, burn takes place. The whole system now being almost airtight, a build-up of pressure follows. The pressure acts against the column of water in the exhaust pipe and expels it from the system. As the flow of exhaust gas moves into the tail pipe, it moves a loose piston in the combustion chamber which extracts and stores sufficient power to work the machine's timing mechanisms. Energy from this piston is stored by lifting weights attached to a balance wheel. The return of this wheel to its lower position under the pull of the weights governs the timing for the next cycle by operating the bellows, fuel dispenser, the fuse and valves at the correct points in the cycle. The tail pipe, being under the boat, fills with water ready for the next discharge. The fall of the timing piston also expels the exhaust gases via a pipe above the ignition chamber, which is closed off by a valve during the burn part of the cycle.

== Further development ==
On 24 December 1807, the brothers reported to Lazare Carnot that they had developed a new, highly flammable fuel (powder) by mixing one part resin with nine parts of crushed coal dust.

In 1817 the brothers achieved another first by using a rudimentary fuel injection system.

By 1817 there was insufficient progress to attract subsidy and investment, so the ten-year patent expired. Worried about losing control of the engine, Claude traveled first to Paris and then to England in an attempt to further the project. He received the patent consent of King George III on 23 December 1817. This was not the key to success. Over the next ten years, Claude remained in London, settled in Kew and descended into delirium, whereby he squandered much of the family fortune chasing inappropriate business opportunities for the Pyréolophore. Nicéphore, meanwhile, was also occupied with the task of inventing photography.

=== Design flaw ===
In 1824, after the brothers' project had lost momentum, the French physicist Nicolas Léonard Sadi Carnot scientifically established the thermodynamic theory of idealized heat engines. This highlighted the flaw in the design of the Pyréolophore, whereby it needed a compression mechanism to increase the difference between the upper and lower working temperatures and potentially unlock sufficient power and efficiency.

== Reconstruction ==
To celebrate the bicentenary, the Paris Photographic Institute (Spéos) and the Niépce House Museum produced a 3D animation of the working machine in 2010. Manuel Bonnet and Jean-Louis Bruley of the Maison Nicéphore Nièpce and Hadrien Duhamel of the École Nationale Supérieure d'Arts et Métiers (ENSAM) created the video.

== See also ==
- Timeline of transportation technology
- History of the internal combustion engine
- Timeline of heat engine technology
