= Turbosteamer =

A turbosteamer is a BMW combined cycle engine using a waste heat recovery unit. Waste heat energy from the internal combustion engine is used to generate steam for a steam engine which creates supplemental power for the vehicle. The turbosteamer device is affixed to the exhaust and cooling system. It salvages the heat wasted in the exhaust and radiator (as much as 80% of heat energy) and uses a steam piston or turbine to relay that power to the crankshaft. The steam circuit produces 14 hp (10 kW) and 15 ft⋅lbf (20 N⋅m) of torque at peak (for a 1.8 straight-4 engine), yielding an estimated 15% gain in fuel efficiency. Unlike gasoline-electric hybrids, these gains increase at higher, steadier speeds.

== Timescale ==
BMW has been a pioneer of this concept since as early as 2000 under the direction of Dr. Raymond Freymann, and while they were designing this system to fit most current BMW models, the technology didn't reach production.

== See also ==
- COGAS
- Cogeneration
- Exhaust heat recovery system
- Still engine
- Turbo-compound engine

== Publications ==
- R. Freymann, W. Strobl, A. Obieglo: The Turbosteamer: A System Introducing the Principle of Cogeneration in Automotive Applications. Motortechnische Zeitschrift, MTZ 05/2008 Jahrgang 69, pp.404-412.
