= BMW H2R =

Racecar running on liquid hydrogen

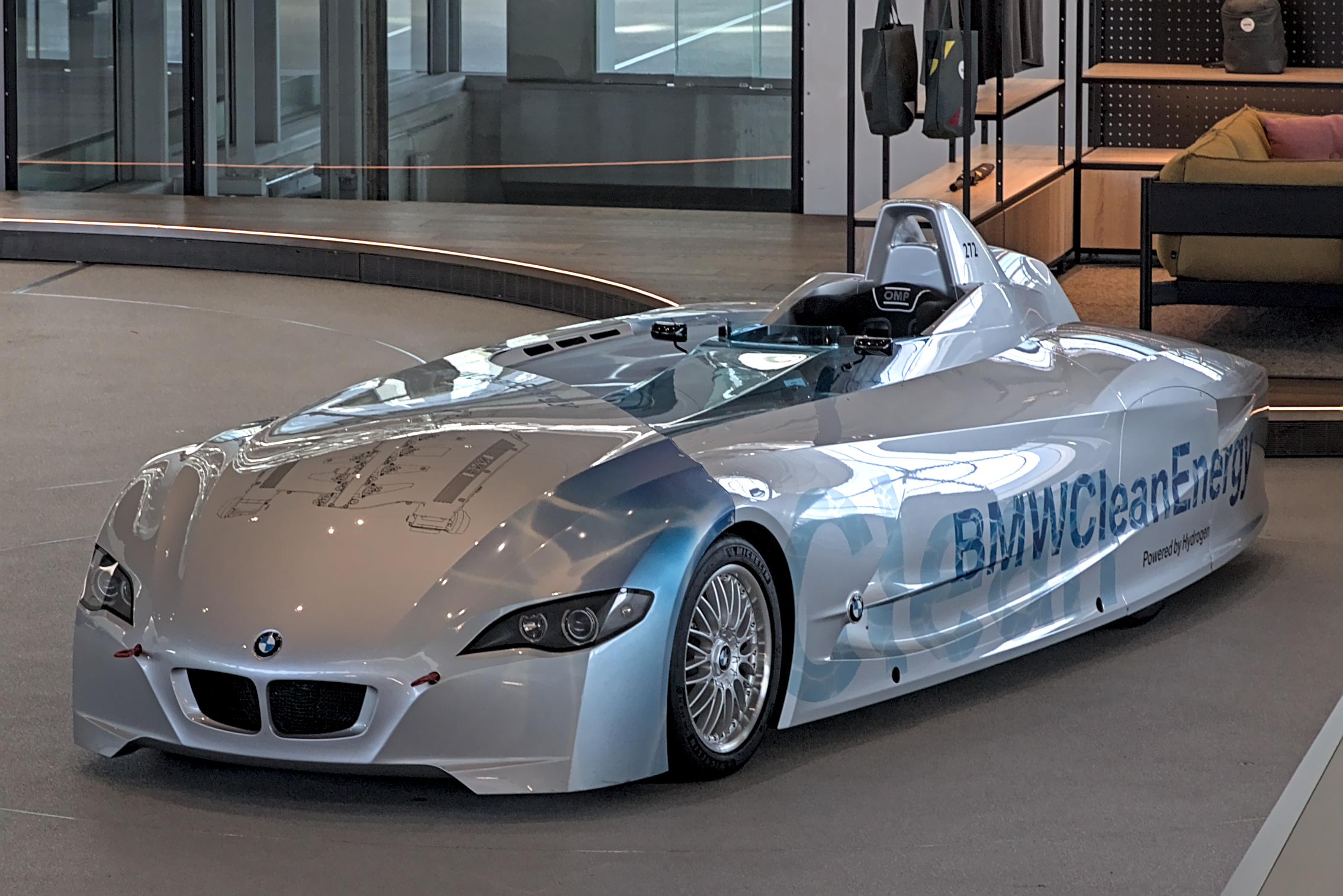
BMW H2R

The BMW H2R ("Hydrogen Record Car") is a racecar adapted to run on liquid hydrogen fuel. It was conceived and developed in 10 months under the direction of Dr. Raymond Freymann.

The H2R’s 6.0-liter V12 engine, which draws on BMW's Valvetronic and Double-VANOS technology, is based on the 760i’s gasoline-fueled powerplant. This H_{2}-powered vehicle generates 232 horsepower (173 kW) and achieved a top speed of 301.95 km/h (187.62 mph).

== Technical data ==
In 2004 on the high-speed track at the Miramas Proving Grounds in France, the BMW H2R set nine international and FIA-ratified records for cars with hydrogen combustion engines.

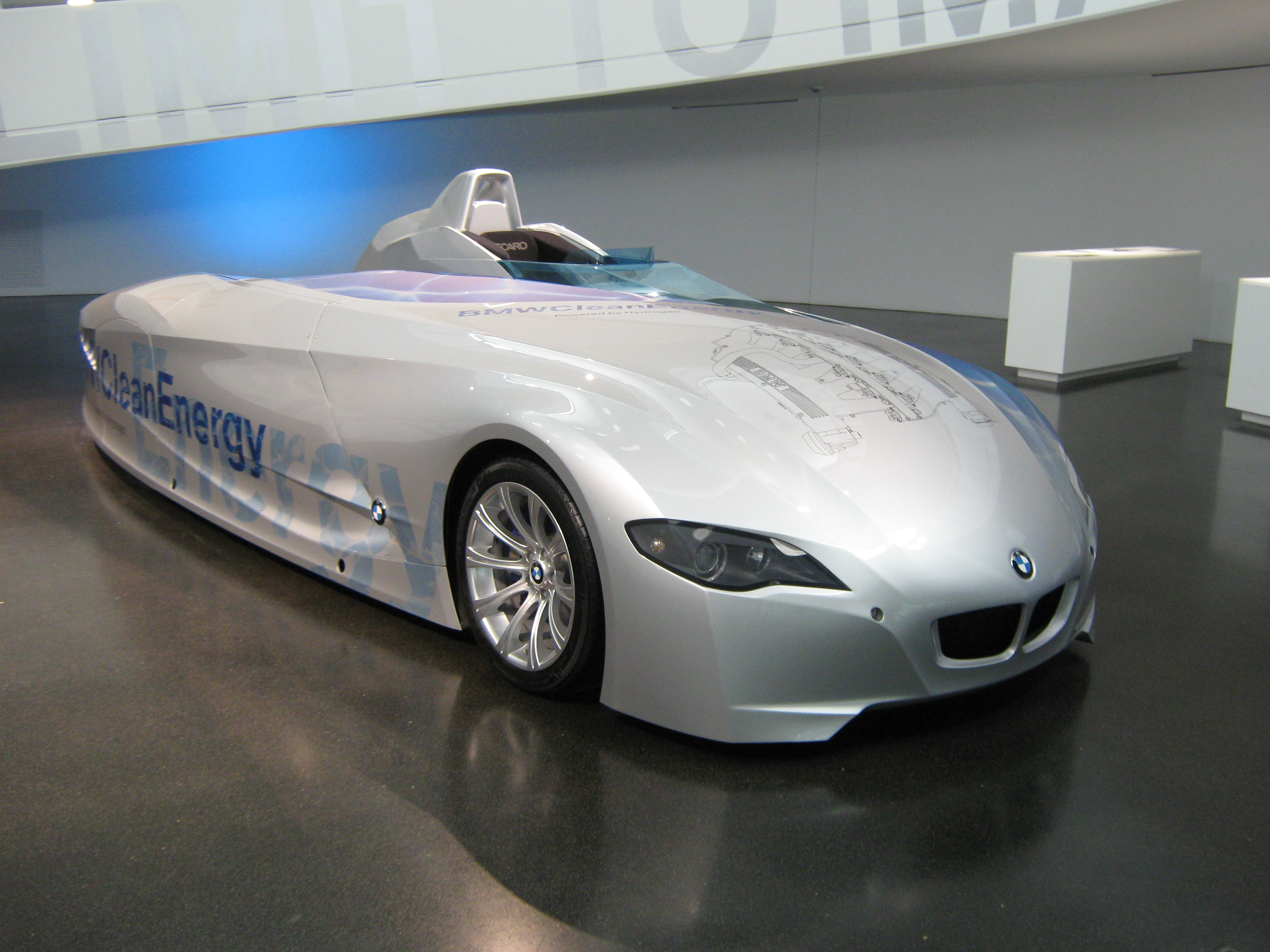
BMW H2R, BMW Museum, Munich, Germany

- Maximum speed: 300.175 km/h (186.520 mph)
- Engine: twelve-cylinder ICE, running on hydrogen
- Bodyshell: aluminium space frame structure
- Outer shell: carbon fibre-reinforced plastic
- Vehicle dimensions: 5.40 metres (212.6 in) long, 2.01 metres (79.1 in) wide, 1.34 metres (52.8 in) high
- Vehicle weight including driver: 1,560 kg (3,440 lb)
- Drag coefficient (cw): 0.21

== BMW Art Car Project: Your Mobile Expectations ==
In 2007, Olafur Eliasson was commissioned by BMW to create the sixteenth art car for the BMW Art Car Project based on the H2R. Eliasson and his team removed the automobile's alloy body and instead replaced it with a new interlocking framework of reflective steel bars and mesh. Layers of ice were created by spraying approximately 530 gallons of water during a period of several days upon the structure. On display, the frozen sculpture is glowing from within. Called Your Mobile Expectations, the vehicle was on special display in a temperature controlled room at the San Francisco Museum of Modern Art from September 8, 2007 to January 13, 2008.

== Records ==
Record	Time (s)	Speed
Flying-start kilometre	11.99	301.95 km/h (187.62 mph)
Flying-start mile	19.91	292.66 km/h (181.85 mph)
Standing-start 1/4 kilometre	9.92	73.42 km/h (45.62 mph)
Standing-start 1/2 kilometre	14.93	97.56 km/h (60.62 mph)
Standing-start 1/2 mile	17.27	104.85 km/h (65.15 mph)
Standing-start mile	36.73	158.68 km/h (98.60 mph)
Standing-start 10 miles (16 km)	221.05	263.63 km/h (163.81 mph)
Standing-start kilometre	26.56	136.34 km/h (84.72 mph)
Standing-start 10 kilometre	146.41	247.68 km/h (153.90 mph)

== See also ==
- List of hydrogen internal combustion engine vehicles

== Publications ==
- R. Freymann, W. Strobl, J. Kübler; Hydrogen Technology in Automotive Engineering: Sustainable, Clean and Powerful. Conf. Proc. of the „First Austrian Hydrogen Conference“, HYCentA, Graz (Austria), 10-11 Oct. 2005
