= Mazda Premacy Hydrogen RE Hybrid =

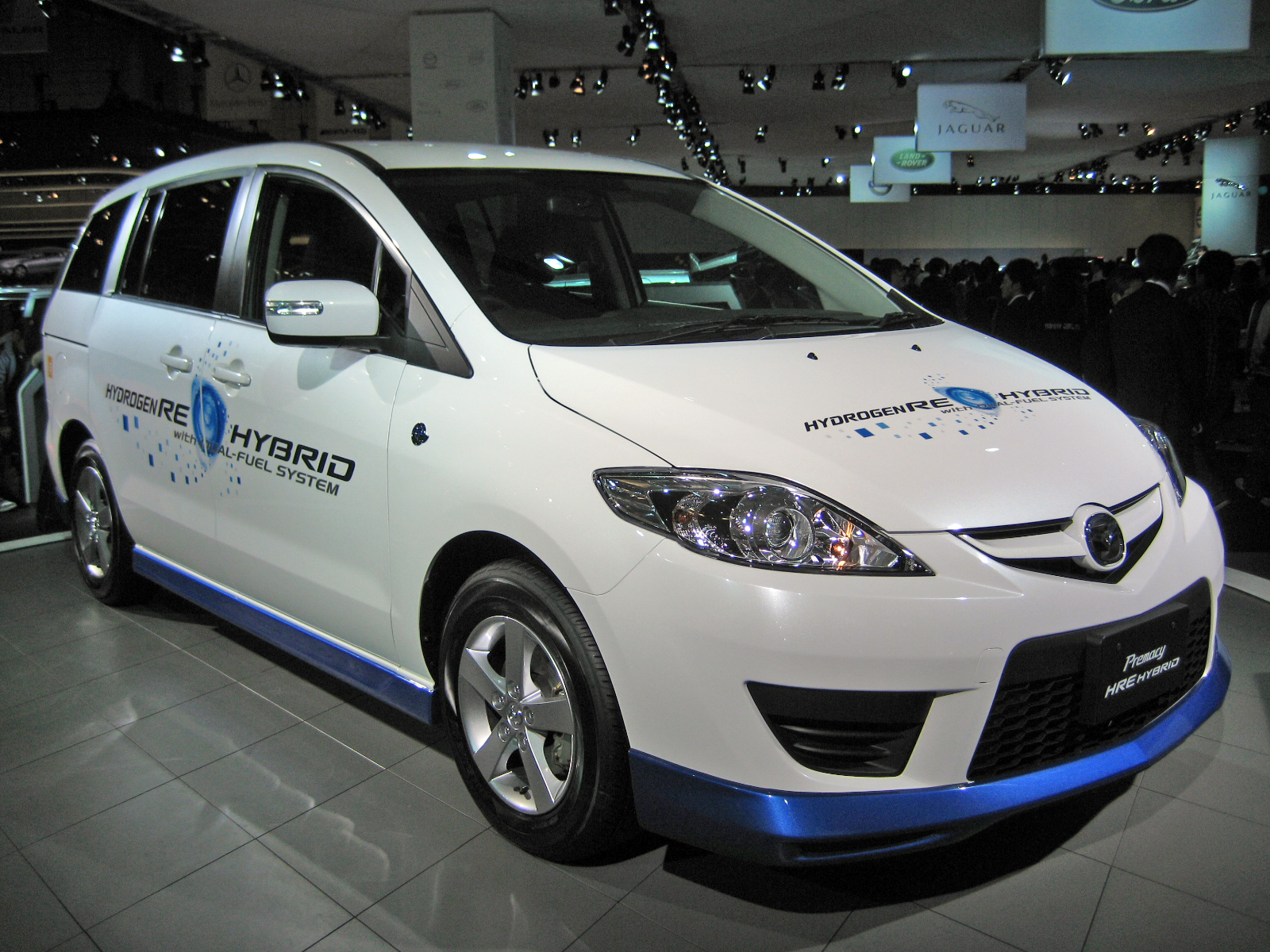
- Mazda Premacy Hydrogen RE Hybrid at the 2007 Tokyo Motor Show

Overview
- Manufacturer: Mazda
- Also called: Mazda5 Hydrogen RE Hybrid; Mazda Hydrogen RE Plug in Hybrid
- Model years: 2005; 2007
- Assembly: Aki District, Hiroshima

Body and chassis
- Class: Compact MPV
- Layout: FF (2005); FR (2007)
- Platform: Ford C1 platform
- Related: Mazda Premacy Hydrogen RE Range Extender EV

Powertrain
- Engine: 2 rotor Mazda Wankel engine and electric motor
- Electric motor: 3x Electric motors ()
- Hybrid drivetrain: MHEV dual-fuel system (Mazda5 / Premacy Hydrogen RE Hybrid); PHEV dual-fuel system (Mazda Hydrogen RE Plug in Hybrid)
- Battery: Ni-MH
- Range: Up to 450 km (280 mi)

Dimensions
- Wheelbase: 2,750 mm (108 in)
- Length: 4,565 mm (180 in)
- Width: 1,745 mm (69 in)
- Height: 1,614 mm (64 in)
- Curb weight: 1,755 kg (3,869 lb) (2007)

The Mazda Premacy Hydrogen RE Hybrid or Mazda5 Hydrogen RE Hybrid was a hydrogen powered hybrid car produced by Mazda. Later models were also called the Mazda Hydrogen RE Plug in Hybrid. The first car was unveiled in 2005, with an improved version shown at the 2007 Tokyo Motor Show. Mazda planned for the car to enter production and leased a few cars to end users in 2009 in 2010.

== Background ==
Mazda launched its first hydrogen-powered concept car, the HR-X, in 1991. The car was followed by other models, refining their technology over the following decade until the Mazda RX-8 Hydrogen RE of 2003. This car was the first hydrogen-powered rotary-engined vehicle to be offered on a commercial lease in Japan and was used in the Norwegian HyNor project to demonstrate the viability of hydrogen as a vehicle fuel.

== Design ==
=== 2005 model ===
Realising the limitations of these smaller vehicles, Mazda developed a hydrogen vehicle based on the successful Premacy compact MPV. Mazda had previously produced the prototype Premacy FCEV in 2001 but this had been powered by a fuel cell. The new model was different and was designed to demonstrate a vehicle that could make hydrogen power mainstream. The drivetrain was taken from the Mazda RX-8 Hydrogen RE but had a 40% increase in power and increased range. Power was provided by a two rotor REGENESIS Wankel engine of 1,308 cc (79.8 in^{3}) capacity combined with a 30 kW (40 hp) electric motor. Energy was stored in a petrol tank, hydrogen storage tank and nickel metal hydride battery, and the front mounted engine drove the front wheels. The battery was recharged by regenerative braking and provided some power to increase acceleration as in a mild hybrid.

Internally, the car was equipped with three rows of seats, with the additional components, including the electric motor and hydrogen storage tanks having limited impact on the internal space. The car was first unveiled at the 2005 Tokyo Motor Show, with a vision to be in showrooms by 2008.

=== 2007 model ===
An improved version was unveiled at the 2007 Tokyo Motor Show. This vehicle had a range of different features, not least that although motors were still mounted at the front, drive was to the rear. Similarly, rather than use a gearbox, drive was through the electric motor, creating a series hybrid vehicle drivetrain. The hydrogen tank stored 2.4 kg (5.3 lb) hydrogen at 350 bar (35,000 kPa), while the petrol tank had a capacity of 60 L (13 imp gal; 16 US gal).

While running on hydrogen, the Wankel engine produced 110 kW (148 hp) and up to 140 N⋅m (103 lbf⋅ft) torque at 5000 rpm. While running on petrol, the engine produced 154 kW (207 hp) and 222 N⋅m (164 lbf⋅ft) torque at the same engine speed. The battery was also updated to a lithium model and power increased to 110 kW (148 hp). The battery was not designed to be a major energy source, providing limited range, but the car was fitted with an external plug for recharging.

=== Performance ===
The 2007 car was capable of a maximum speed of 140 km/h (87 mph) and could accelerate to 100 km/h (62 mph) in 10 seconds. It had a claimed range of 200 km (124 mi) on hydrogen and 250 km (155 mi) on petrol.

== Production ==
The car was produced in small numbers for demonstration in Japan. The first lease for a Premacy Hydrogen RE Hybrid started in March 2009. The first car was delivered to Iwatani Corporation on 26 May 2009. By January 2010, the company had leased five vehicles to end users.

== See also ==
- List of Mazda vehicles
- List of hydrogen internal combustion engine vehicles
