= Scandinavian hydrogen highway partnership =

The Scandinavian hydrogen highway partnership is a collaboration started in June 2006 to connect the regional hydrogen infrastructure: Hydrogen Link (Denmark), Hyfuture (Sweden) and Hynor (Norway).

The planned highway is part of the hydrogen infrastructure, there are several hydrogen re-fueling stations planned along the route.

== See also ==
- Hydrogen economy
