= HyNor =

Hydrogen fuel project in Norway

Coordinates: 59°58′32″N 11°03′13″E

The HyNor-project was a nationally supported project which purpose was to facilitate and coordinate the introduction of hydrogen as a fuel in Norway, running from 2003 to 2012. Toward the commercial introduction of hydrogen vehicles in 2015, the HyNor-project focused on acquiring an early pre-commercial fleet of hydrogen vehicles, and keeping a close dialogue with the leading car manufacturers and other similar initiatives in the Nordic countries and around the world.

== History ==
The HyNor-project started out as a hydrogen highway-project in Norway. It was initiated by large industrial actors such as Statoil and Norsk Hydro in 2003 with the goal of a market-realistic demonstration of hydrogen refuelling stations, as well as hydrogen vehicles. Several hydrogen refuelling stations were built along the 580-kilometer (360 mi) route from Oslo to Stavanger. Norway's first hydrogen fueling station was opened in 2006 near Stavanger, the second in Porsgrunn in 2007, and two stations were opened in Oslo and Lier in 2009. There were also hydrogen stations planned for Bergen and Lyngdal, but these projects were never carried out.

The official opening of the HyNor hydrogen highway -project took place on 11 May 2009 in Oslo, and most of the stations, except for the one in Stavanger are still in operation today. The infrastructure is part of the Scandinavian hydrogen highway partnership.

In October 2011, Statoil announced they wanted to close the hydrogen refuelling stations in Stavanger, Porsgrunn, Drammen and Oslo after 2012. A new company, HyOP, was established to take over the ownership and operation of the stations, and has done so since May 2012.

In June 2012 a new refueling station was opened at Akershus EnergiPark in Skedsmo Municipality.

Investment in hydrogen technology has continued. In 2017, Akershus county put aside 19.5 million kronor to invest in continuing the hydrogen bus scheme into 2019.

As at December 2020, IFE's Hynor fuel cell and hydrogen technology test center was located in Kjeller.

== Vehicles ==
The HyNor-project had tested several different hydrogen vehicles:

- 15 retrofitted Toyota Prius hydrogen internal combustion engine (ICE) vehicles (2007–2012)
- 4 Mazda RX-8 Hydrogen RE dual fuel hydrogen/gasoline ICE vehicles (2009–2012)
- 10 Mercedes-Benz B-class F-CELL (2011–2014)
- 5 Think City hydrogen cars
- 2 Hyundai ix35 FCEVs

== Station network ==
At its maximum extent it had the following filling stations:

- Stavanger - H_{2} from natural gas reforming (steam reforming), HCNG 8%, at 350 and 700 Bar (shut down in November 2011)
- Porsgrunn - H_{2} byproduct from chlorine production, 700 bar refueling
- Drammen - Trucked-in hydrogen, 700 bar refueling (shutdown in 2015 and moved to Oslo airport Gardermoen)
- Oslo - Trucked-in hydrogen, 700 bar refueling
- Oslo - Gaustad - On-site electrolysis (10 Nm3/h), 700 bar refueling
- Oslo - Rosenholm - On-site electrolysis (2x60 Nm3/h), 350 bar refueling (bus-only station)
- Lillestrøm - H_{2} from biogas via Sorption Enhanced Steam Methane Reforming(SE-SMR) and solar electrolysis, 700 bar refueling.

== See also ==
- Zero Emission Resource Organisation
- Scandinavian hydrogen highway partnership
- Hydrogen infrastructure
- Hydrogen economy
