= Pierre de Rivaz =

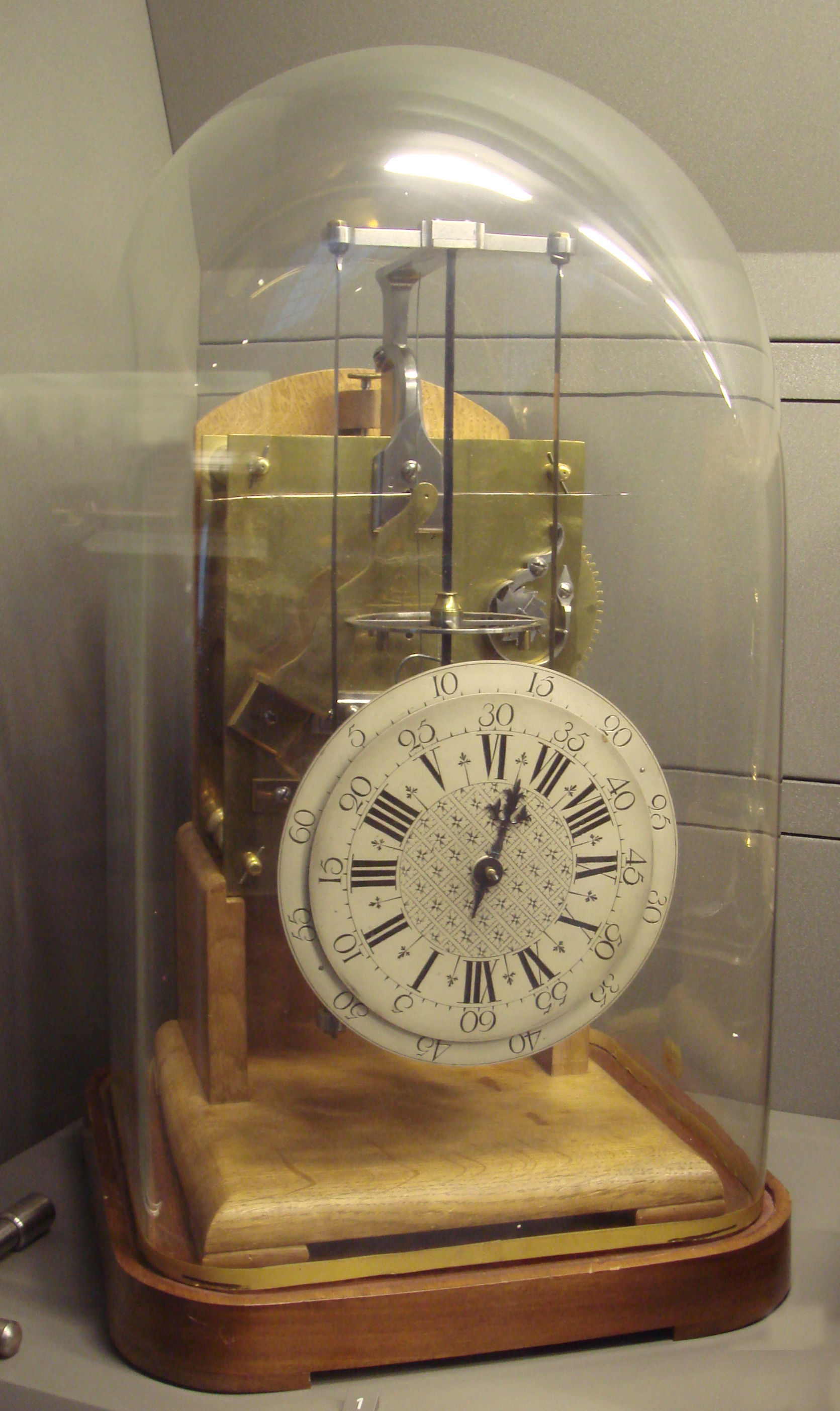
Pierre de Rivaz marine clock circa 1750.

Pierre de Rivaz (1711 – 1772) was clockmaker of the 18th century, from Saint-Gingolph then in the Savoyard state. He built a clock in 1740 that was powered by variations in air temperature and pressure, a type of Atmos clock.

== See also ==
- Marine chronometer
