= Mazda RX-8 Hydrogen RE =

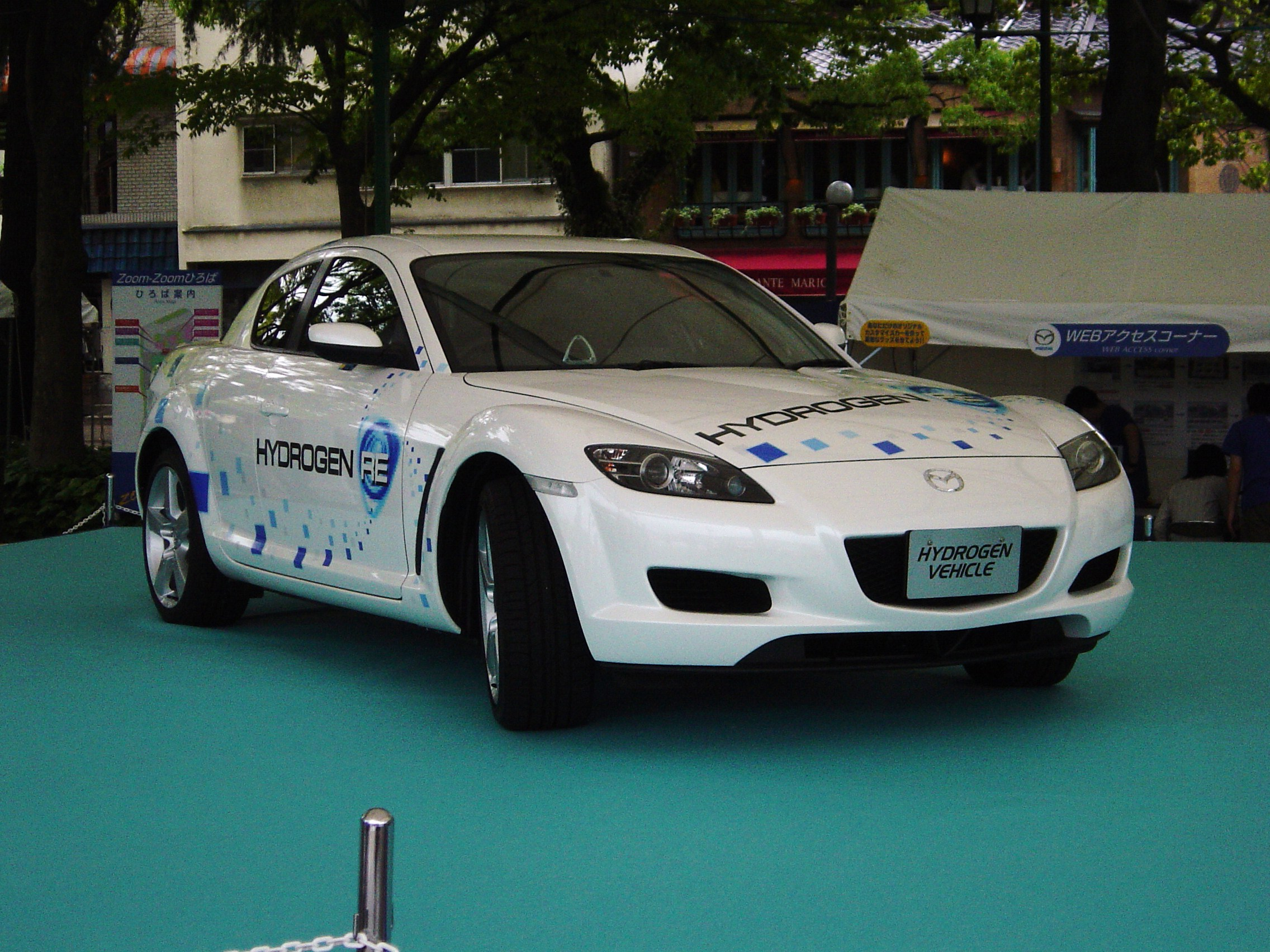

Overview
- Manufacturer: Mazda
- Also called: Mazda RX-8 HRE
- Production: 2003; 2006 (1 built)

Body and chassis
- Related: Mazda RX-8

Powertrain
- Engine: 1.3 L, 2-rotor Renesis R2 Wankel Rotary engine
- Transmission: 5-speed manual 4-Speed Jatco-Mazda RC4A-EL automatic
- Hybrid drivetrain: dual-fuel system
- Range: 100 km (62 mi) (Hydrogen mode)

The Mazda RX-8 Hydrogen RE is a 2003 bi-fuel version of the RX-8 sports car, in which the twin-rotor wankel rotary engine is configured to run on either hydrogen or gasoline. This is the fifth Mazda vehicle to be fitted with a hydrogen wankel rotary engine.

== Specifications ==
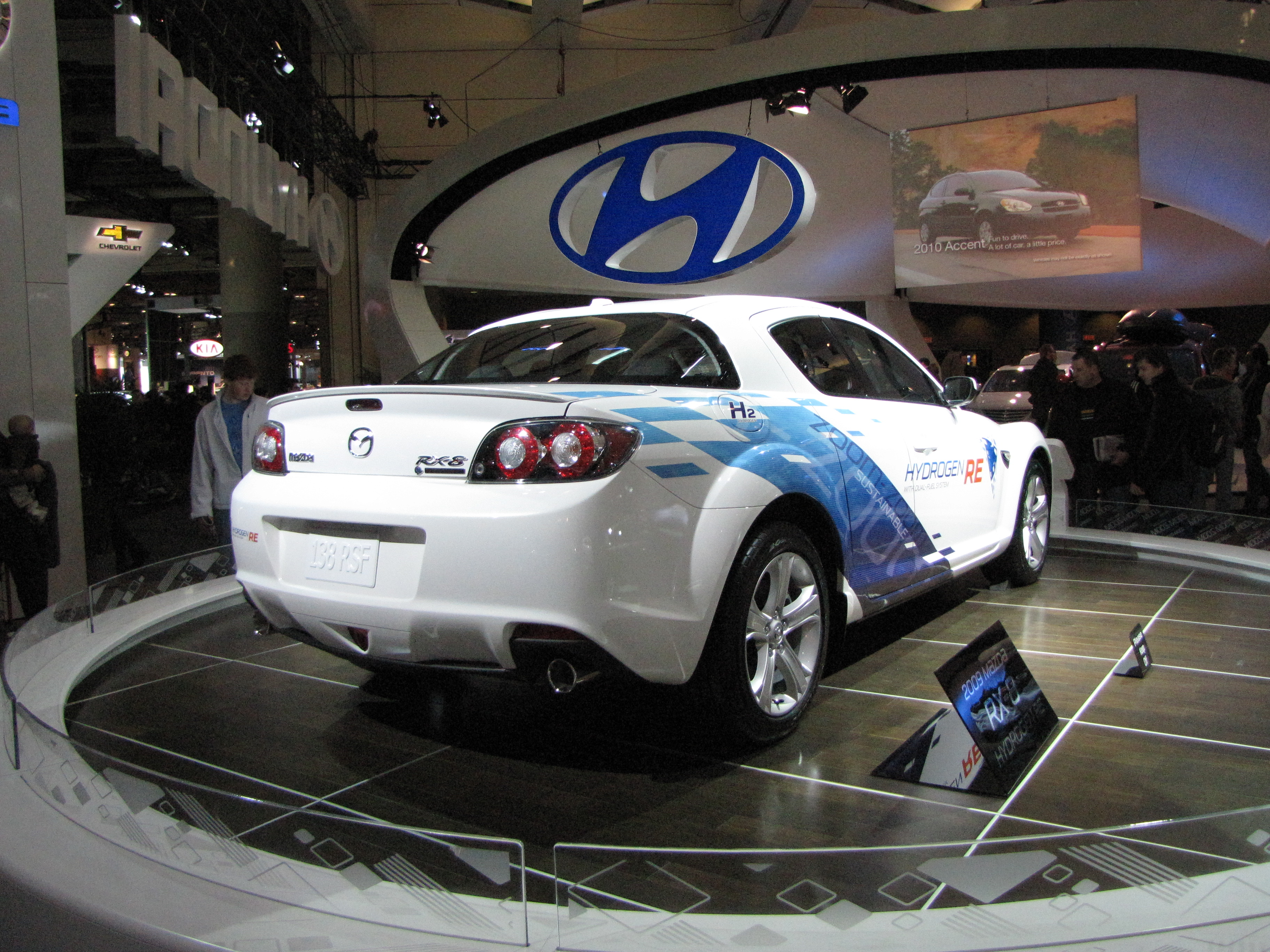
Mazda RX-8 Hydrogen RE rear

The hydrogen tank is made up of aluminum and carbon fibre and has a capacity of 110 liters at 350 bar stores up to 2.4 kilograms of hydrogen and is fitted in addition to the 61-liter gasoline tank. The car can be switched from gasoline to hydrogen mode using a button in the cabin. The Hydrogen tank takes up most of the RX-8s trunk space and all the hydrogen components weigh in at 187 lbs in total. Running in hydrogen mode, it produces no emissions other than water vapor and has a range of around 100 km (62 mi). In 2005, Mazda obtained street approval for this vehicle. The following year, the first vehicles were leased to customers in Idemitsu and Iwatani at a price of 420,000 JPY per month. In November 2007, Mazda announced the delivery of 30 RX-8 HRE to the Norwegian hydrogen project Hynor.

The bivalent RENESIS wankel rotary engine has the following data:

| Engine | twin-rotor Wankel engine | |
| Chamber volume | 2 x 654 cc (equivalent Displacement: 1,308 cc) | |
| Mode | Hydrogen | Gasoline |
| Performance | 80 kW (107 hp, 109 PS) | 154 kW (206 hp, 210 PS) |
| Maximum torque | 140 Nm (103 lb ft) at 5.000 U/min | 222 Nm (164 lb ft) at 5.000 U/min |
| Maximum speed | 170 km/h (106 mph) (H_{2}-operation) | |
| Acceleration from 0–100 km/h (0-62 mph). | 10 seconds | 7.2 seconds |

== See also ==
- Mazda Premacy Hydrogen RE Hybrid
- List of hydrogen internal combustion engine vehicles
