= François Isaac de Rivaz =

Swiss inventor and politician (1752-1828)

Isaac de Rivaz
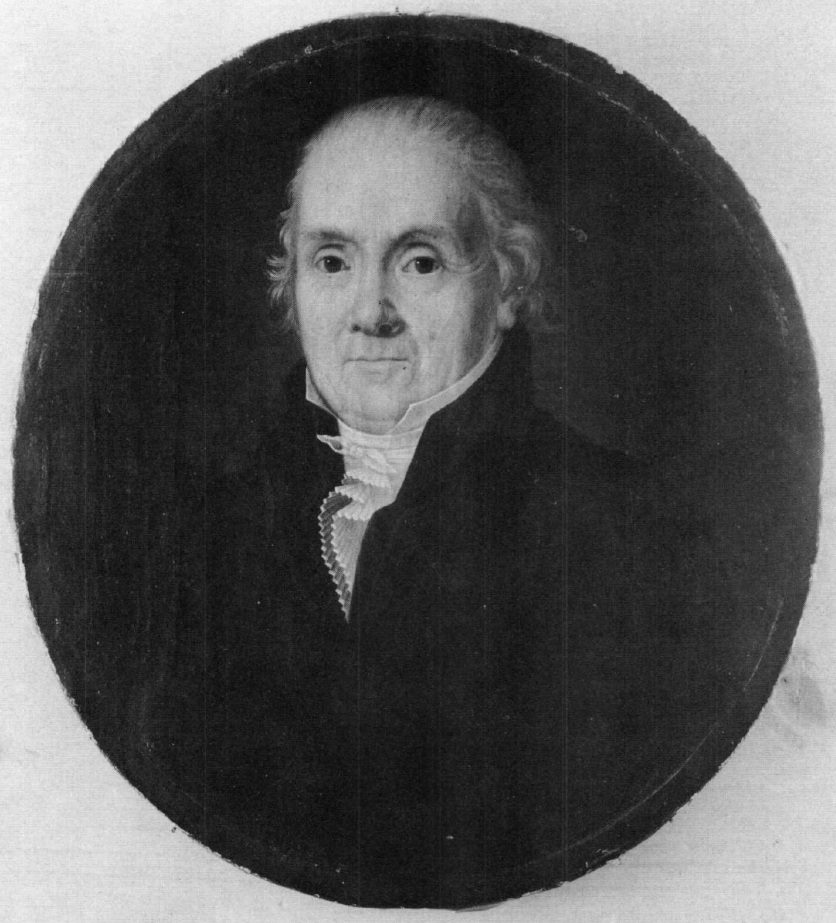
- Isaac de Rivaz
- Born: December 19, 1752; Paris, Kingdom of France
- Died: July 30, 1828 (aged 75); Sion, Switzerland
- Occupations: Politician, engineer
- Known for: The world's first automobile powered by an 'internal combustion engine'
- Father: Pierre de Rivaz

François Isaac de Rivaz (December 19, 1752, in Paris – July 30, 1828, in Sion) was a French-born Swiss inventor and a politician. He invented a hydrogen-powered internal combustion engine with electric ignition and described it in a French patent published in 1807. In 1808 he fitted it into a primitive working vehicle – "the world's first internal combustion powered automobile".

== Biography ==
Isaac was born in Paris to a family from the Valais, now the canton of Valais in Switzerland. His father, Pierre de Rivaz, born in Saint-Gingolph, had moved to Paris in 1748 and established himself as a clockmaker and industrialist. In 1763 the family settled in Moûtiers in Savoy (Kingdom of Sardinia). The last two boys, Anne-Joseph and Isaac, came to settle in Saint-Gingolph. It is not known at which schools he studied, but he became fluent in Latin plus mastering mathematics and geometry, whilst continuing his study of mechanics throughout his life. He qualified as both a surveyor and notary and worked for the state of Valais.

Isaac had many interests plus an intuitive and extremely curious mind which was driven by the demon of discovery. His experimental work was overflowing. He experimented with steam-powered vehicles in the late 18th century. He also studied the ignition of combustible gases.

== Internal combustion engine ==
After retirement from the Army, living in Switzerland, he invented a primitive internal combustion engine which he constructed in 1807. It was powered by a mixture of hydrogen and oxygen manually ignited by electric spark, but the engine neither involved the in-cylinder compression, the crank, nor the connecting rod. A year later, Isaac built an early automobile for his new engine to power.

== Alternative claims for internal combustion engines ==
Coincidentally, in 1807 Nicéphore Niépce installed his 'moss, coal-dust and resin'-fueled Pyréolophore internal combustion engine in a boat and powered up the river Saone in France to be granted a patent by the Emperor Napoleon Bonaparte. The discrete, virtually simultaneous, implementations of these two designs of internal combustion in different modes of transport means that the de Rivaz engine can be correctly described as "the world's first use of an internal combustion engine in an auto-mobile (in 1808)", whilst the "Pyréolophore (in 1807) was the world's first use of an internal combustion engine in a ship".

Although de Rivaz's early work is credited as the first use of the internal combustion engine in an automobile, the further development and mass production of the invention never truly began until the late nineteenth century.

In 1824, the French physicist Nicolas Léonard Sadi Carnot scientifically established the thermodynamic theory of idealized heat engines. This highlighted the shortcoming of these pioneering designs, whereby they needed a compression mechanism to increase the difference between the upper and lower working temperatures and potentially unlock sufficient power and efficiency. Gasoline was not used for internal combustion engines until 1870 when carburetors were invented to convert non-combustible liquid fuels into a combustible gaseous mixture form.

== See also ==
- De Rivaz engine
- Timeline of transportation technology
- Timeline of hydrogen technologies
- History of the internal combustion engine
- Pyréolophore
- Nicéphore Niépce
