= Aluminum internal combustion engine =

Engine made mostly from aluminum metal alloys

An aluminum internal combustion engine is an internal combustion engine made mostly from aluminum metal alloys.

Many internal combustion engines use cast iron and steel extensively for their strength and low cost. Aluminum offers lighter weight at the expense of strength, hardness and often cost. However, with care it can be substituted for many of the components and is widely used. Aluminum crank cases, cylinder blocks, heads and pistons are commonplace. The first airplane engine to fly, in the Wright Flyer of 1903, had an aluminum cylinder block.

All-aluminum engines are rare, as the material is difficult to use in more highly stressed components such as connecting rods and crankshafts. The BSA A10 motorcycle engine had aluminum conrods, while the Škoda 935 Dynamic auto engine had an aluminum crankshaft.

== Russian Aluminum ICE project ==
An aircraft engine made 90 percent from aluminum alloys was developed by scientists and engineers Novosibirsk State Technical University. Work on it was carried out for four years.

The engineers of NSTU, while working on this engine, applied the development of Institute of Inorganic Chemistry SB RAS. The designers were assisted by scientists Alexei Rogov and Olga Terleeva.

The crankshaft and main engine gearbox are made of aluminum. This allows reduction of mass by 40-50 percent, while maintaining the same power, compared to conventional steel engines.

A prototype engine was tested on ordinary AI-95 gasoline. Tests were going on throughout 2018 and completed in early 2019. As a result, the high performance characteristics of the heavy-duty coating, which the aluminum parts are processed with, were confirmed.

According to the professor of the Aircraft and Helicopter Engineering Department of the Faculty of Aircraft of NSTU, Ilya Zverkov, this engine was developed for the aircraft Yak-52 by order of the Russian Aviation Revival Foundation, which is based at the Mochishche airfield near Novosibirsk.
