= Split-cycle engine =

Type of internal combustion engine

The split-cycle engine is a type of internal combustion engine.

== Design ==
In a conventional Otto cycle engine, each cylinder performs four strokes per cycle: intake, compression, power, and exhaust. This means that two revolutions of the crankshaft are required for each power stroke. The split-cycle engine divides these four strokes between two paired cylinders: one for intake and compression, and another for power and exhaust. Compressed air is transferred from the compression cylinder to the power cylinder through a crossover passage. Fuel is then injected and fired to produce the power stroke.

== History ==
The Backus Water Motor Company of Newark, New Jersey was producing an early example of a split cycle engine as far back as 1891. The engine, of "a modified A form, with the crank-shaft at the top", was water-cooled and consisted of one working cylinder and one compressing cylinder of equal size and utilized a hot-tube ignitor system. It was produced in sizes ranging from 1/2 to 3 horsepower (2.2 kW) and the company had plans to offer a scaled-up version capable of 25 horsepower (19 kW) or more.

The Atkinson differential engine was a two piston, single cylinder four-stroke engine that also used a displacer piston to provide the fuel air mixture for use by the power piston. However, the power piston did the compression.

The split-single engine (British English; twingle engine in U.S. English) is a twin-cylinder (or more) two-stroke engine; more precisely, it has one or more U-tube cylinders that each use a pair of pistons, one in each arm of the U. However, both pistons in each pair are used for power (and the underside of both supplies fuel air mixture, if crankcase scavenging is used), and they only differ in that one piston works the transfer port to provide the fuel air mixture for use in both cylinders and the other piston works the exhaust port, so that the burnt mixture is exhausted via that cylinder. Unlike the Scuderi both cylinders are connected to the combustion chamber. As neither piston works as a displacer piston at all, this engine has nothing whatsoever to do with the split cycle engine apart from a purely coincidental similarity of the names.

The Scuderi engine is a design of a split-cycle, internal combustion engine invented by Carmelo J. Scuderi. The Scuderi Group, an engineering and licensing company based in West Springfield, Massachusetts and founded by Carmelo Scuderi’s children, said that the prototype was completed and was unveiled to the public on April 20, 2009.

The Tour Engine is an opposed-cylinder split-cycle internal combustion engine that uses a novel Spool Shuttle Crossover Valve (SSCV) to transfer fuel/air charge from the cold to hot cylinder. The first prototype was completed in June 2008. Tour Engine was funded by grants from the Israel Ministry of National Infrastructures, Energy and Water Resources and ARPA-E

Another split-cycle design, using external combustion, is the Zajac engine.

== New Zealand scam – Rick Mayne's Split-Cycle engine ==
In 2009 investigative journalist Gerard Ryle reported a scam by New Zealander Rick Mayne that lost investors hundreds of millions of NZ dollars. Rick Mayne claimed success with a Split Cycle engine that used a multitude of small cylinders arranged in a radial arrangement with pistons operated by a Geneva mechanism. This scam engine was never successfully run in a meaningful demonstration, but significant capital was raised from unsuspecting investors through a share plan, and then lost.

Ryle reported on the Rick Mayne scam, along with other scams involving fuel saving, in his book Firepower, and also on ABC radio in 2009:

Even British newspaper the Independent was taken in by the scam, as was British racing driver Jack Brabham
