= Scuderi engine =

Proposed engine

An animation showing the cycle of the engine

The Scuderi engine, in 2005–2013 was a claimed new type of engine with claimed benefits. No engine to date has been produced commercially, despite reports of the engine's potential. The Scuderi family behind the engine has been involved in litigation related to investors' funds, and many performance claims have not been substantiated.

== Background ==
The engine, formally called the Scuderi Split Cycle Engine, is a split-cycle, internal combustion engine invented by Carmelo J. Scuderi (April 13, 1925 – October 16, 2002). Scuderi Group, an engineering and licensing company based in West Springfield, Massachusetts and founded by Scuderi's children, is testing a working prototype of the engine that was officially unveiled to the public on April 20, 2009.

In 2009, Scuderi Group released video footage of a naturally aspirated one-liter prototype of the Scuderi engine firing on its own in the laboratory in October, 2009.

Same year, the Scuderi company claimed to have raised $35M to develop the engine, and in 2010 said it was seeking to raise another $40M.

In 2013, the Scuderi company had to pay an SEC fine $100,000 fine and repay monies: for spending shareholder's money on Scuderi family members. And in 2015 further SEC cases against Scuderi followed.

In 2024, automotive industry publication Carbuzz revisited the Scuderi story and concluded that it was a promising engine which failed because the family took investors' funds and turned the project into a Ponzi scheme.

In 2026, Sal and Nick Scuderi told investors that Scuderi Group is still active.

== Design ==
Scuderi engines have paired cylinders, each of which performs two of the tasks (strokes) of a conventional engine. The compression cylinder performs intake and compression. The power cylinder performs combustion and exhaust. Compressed air is transferred from the compression cylinder to the power cylinder through a crossover passage. Fuel is then injected and fired to produce the power stroke.

The power cylinder fires just after the piston has begun its downward motion ("after top dead center", or ATDC). The Scuderi Group says ATDC eliminates a thermal efficiency shortcoming seen in previous split-cycle engine designs. Firing ATDC in a split-cycle arrangement is claimed to eliminate the losses resulting from recompressing the gas.

In a conventional Otto cycle engine, each cylinder performs all four strokes per cycle. This means that two revolutions of the crankshaft are required for each power stroke. The pistons fire every other revolution, while the Scuderi engine fires every revolution. The Otto cycle design convention calls for combustion just before top dead center (BTDC) in order to allow combustion pressure to build.

== Claimed advantages ==
According to 2007 Scuderi Group claims, tests indicate that the Scuderi engine shows gains in efficiency and reduced toxic emissions over conventional four-stroke Otto cycle designs. The company also says that the Scuderi engine could be used as part of an air hybrid system, allowing recovered braking energy to be stored as compressed air. Laboratory tests of the prototype are said to match earlier predictions generated by computer models.

Physical tests released in 2011 indicate that the measured bmep (proportional to torque) was at best 78% of the predicted values, and was much worse at higher rpms.

== Disadvantages ==
As can be seen, this engine requires an extra valve per pair of cylinders compared to an Otto engine, but only when in air-hybrid configuration. In the standard configuration conforming to the schematic above it could use actually one less valve per cylinder pair than an Otto engine. It also has the same power density (power strokes per cylinder per revolution), even though the power cylinder fires on every rotation, because of the extra compression cylinder. While its fuel efficiency and other advantages may make this a useful modern design, the extra complexity would historically have favored the Otto design, when precision machining was more expensive than fuel savings over the engine's lifetime.

== Lawsuits and investigation by the SEC ==
In 2013, the Scuderi company had to pay an SEC fine $100,000 fine and repay monies: for spending shareholder's money on Scuderi family members.

On March 5, 2015, Hino Motors Ltd, a subsidiary of Toyota, filed suit against Scuderi Group in the United States District Court for the District of Massachusetts for breach of contract and other violations. Hino has accused the Scuderi Group of operating a Ponzi scheme by refusing to refund Hino's $150,000 investment and promising to repay it eventually with money they plan to receive from other investors. On March 13, 2015, Federal Judge Mark Mastroianni allowed Hino Motors to maintain a hold that they have on a $68,000 Scuderi Group bank account. The Securities & Exchange Commission has also investigated the Scuderi Group for multi-million dollar payments to family members, and a separate investor has also filed federal suit against the Scuderi Group.

Since 2015, various other investors have also sued Scuderi, which typically settles out of court.

== Patent claims by Scuderi Group ==
As of August 2011, Scuderi Group said its patent portfolio included more than 476 patent applications worldwide, more than 154 of which have issued as patents in more than 50 countries.

== Claimed 2008 Partners of Scuderi Group ==
In 2008, the Scuderi Group claimed partnerships with several automotive engineering companies to assist with engineering the Scuderi engine's complementary components. German automotive supply company Mahle GmbH was said to be working on the pistons, Swedish engine developer Cargine Engineering AB assisting with the air-activated valves, Denver-based Gates Corporation engineering the belts, and Germany-based Schaeffler Group contributing to the valve train assembly. The engineering division of Germany's Robert Bosch GmbH was claimed to be working on the timing mechanism of the engine.

== 2009 – WSJ claim of Agreements with major car companies ==
In 2009, in The Wall Street Journal a Daimler AG scientist familiar with the matter said that the design "has potential". Various manufacturers, including Honda, Daimler AG, Fiat, and PSA Peugeot Citroën, were said to have signed non-disclosure agreements with Scuderi Group.

== Regenerative braking ==
Regenerative braking is achieved by connecting an air reservoir to the crossover passage. During braking, energy is stored in the form of compressed air for later use.

== 2012 – Performance claimed by Scuderi group ==
The predicted best brake-specific fuel consumption (BSFC) when turbocharged is 233 g/kWh at 1400 rpm, and in the same configuration the engine has a specific power output of 75 kW/litre at 4000 rpm. In naturally aspirated form the BSFC is 269 g/kWh and specific output is 30 kW/litre.

== See also ==
- Split-cycle engine
- Scuderi cycle
- Split-single engine
