= Scuderi cycle =

A Scuderi cycle is a thermodynamic cycle that is constructed out of the following series of thermodynamic processes:

- A-B and C-D (TOP and BOTTOM of the loop): a pair of quasi-parallel adiabatic processes
- D-A (LEFT side of the loop): a positively sloped, increasing pressure, increasing volume process
- B-C (RIGHT side of the loop): an isochoric process

The adiabatic processes are impermeable to heat: heat flows rapidly into the loop through the left expanding process, resulting in increasing pressure while volume is increasing; some of it flows back out through the right depressurizing process; the remaining heat does the work.

== See also ==
- Scuderi engine
