= Outside flame ignitor =

Device used in internal-combustion engines

An outside flame ignitor was an early ignition device used in internal combustion engines that used a flame outside the engine and a sliding port on the cylinder head. At the appropriate time in the compression cycle of the engine, the port would briefly be opened and closed allowing the fuel/air mixture in the cylinder to be ignited by the flame. They had many problems, including partial loss of compression through the port when it opened and many mechanical problems with the mechanism that operated the port. They were considered obsolete before 1911.
