= Component parts of internal combustion engines =

Internal combustion engines come in a wide variety of types, but have certain family resemblances, and thus share many common types of components.

== Combustion chambers ==
Internal combustion engines can contain any number of combustion chambers (cylinders), with numbers between one and twelve being common, though as many as 36 have been used, such as in the Lycoming R-7755.

Engines with a high number of cylinders have two operational benefits: first, the engine has a larger displacement with smaller individual reciprocating masses, that is, the mass of each piston can be less thus making a smoother-running engine since the engine tends to vibrate as a result of the pistons moving up and down. The second benefit is that the number of the same size cylinders will double the torque and power. The downside to having more pistons is that the engine will tend to weigh more and generate more internal friction as the greater number of pistons rub against the inside of their cylinders. This tends to decrease fuel efficiency and robs the engine of some of its power. For high-performance gasoline engines using current materials and technology, such as the engines found in modern automobiles, there seems to be a point around 10 or 12 cylinders after which the addition of cylinders becomes an overall detriment to performance and efficiency. Although, exceptions such as the W16 engine from Volkswagen exist.

- Most car engines have four to eight cylinders, with some high-performance cars having ten, 12 — or even 16, and some very small cars and trucks having two or three. In previous years, some quite large cars such as the DKW and Saab 92, had two-cylinder or two-stroke engines.
- Radial aircraft engines had from three to 28 cylinders; examples include the small Kinner B-5 and the large Pratt & Whitney R-4360. Larger examples were built as multiple rows. As each row contains an odd number of cylinders, to give an even firing sequence for a four-stroke engine, an even number indicates a two- or four-row engine. The largest of these was the Lycoming R-7755 with 36 cylinders (four rows of nine cylinders), but it did not enter production.
- Motorcycles commonly have from one to four cylinders, with a few high-performance models having six; although, some 'novelties' exist with 8, 10, or 12.
- Snowmobiles Usually have one to four cylinders and can be both 2-stroke or 4-stroke, normally in the in-line configuration; however, there are again some novelties that exist with V-4 engines
- Small portable appliances such as chainsaws, generators, and domestic lawn mowers most commonly have one cylinder, but two-cylinder chainsaws exist.
- Large reversible two-cycle marine diesels have a minimum of three to over ten cylinders. Freight diesel locomotives usually have around 12 to 20 cylinders due to space limitations, as larger cylinders take more space (volume) per kwh, due to the limit on average piston speed of less than 30 ft/sec on engines lasting more than 40,000 hours under full power.

== Ignition system ==
The ignition system of an internal combustion engines depends on the type of engine and fuel used. Petrol engines are typically ignited by a precisely timed spark, and diesel engines by compression heating. Historically, outside flame and hot-tube systems were used, see hot bulb engine.

=== Spark ===
In a spark ignition engine, a mixture is ignited by an electric spark from a spark plug — the timing of which is very precisely controlled. Almost all gasoline engines are of this type. Diesel engines timing is precisely controlled by the pressure pump and injector.

The normal plug distance between the spark plug is 1mm apart, and the voltage is 3000v at normal atmospheric conditions.

=== Compression ===
Ignition occurs as the temperature of the fuel/air mixture is taken over its autoignition temperature, due to heat generated by the compression of the air during the compression stroke. The vast majority of compression ignition engines are diesels in which the fuel is mixed with the air after the air has reached ignition temperature. In this case, the timing comes from the fuel injection system. Very small model engines for which simplicity and light weight is more important than fuel costs use easily ignited fuels (a mixture of kerosene, ether, and lubricant) and adjustable compression to control ignition timing for starting and running.

=== Ignition timing ===
For reciprocating engines, the point in the cycle at which the fuel-oxidizer mixture is ignited has a direct effect on the efficiency and output of the ICE. The thermodynamics of the idealized Carnot heat engine tells us that an ICE is most efficient if most of the burning takes place at a high temperature, resulting from compression — near top dead center. The speed of the flame front is directly affected by the compression ratio, fuel mixture temperature, and octane rating or cetane number of the fuel. Leaner mixtures and lower mixture pressures burn more slowly requiring more advanced ignition timing. It is important to have combustion spread by a thermal flame front (deflagration), not by a shock wave. Combustion propagation by a shock wave is called detonation and, in engines, is also known as knocking or pinging.

So at least in gasoline-burning engines, ignition timing is largely a compromise between a later "retarded" spark — which gives greater efficiency with high octane fuel — and an earlier "advanced" spark that avoids detonation with the fuel used. For this reason, high-performance diesel automobile proponents, such as Gale Banks, believe that

There’s only so far you can go with an air-throttled engine on 91-octane gasoline. In other words, it is the fuel, gasoline, that has become the limiting factor. ... While turbocharging has been applied to both gasoline and diesel engines, only limited boost can be added to a gasoline engine before the fuel octane level again becomes a problem. With a diesel, boost pressure is essentially unlimited. It is literally possible to run as much boost as the engine will physically stand before breaking apart. Consequently, engine designers have come to realize that diesels are capable of substantially more power and torque than any comparably sized gasoline engine.

=== Fuel systems ===
Animated cut through diagram of a typical fuel injector, a device used to deliver fuel to the internal combustion engine.

Fuels burn faster and more efficiently when they present a large surface area to the oxygen in air. Liquid fuels must be atomized to create a fuel-air mixture, traditionally this was done with a carburetor in petrol engines and with fuel injection in diesel engines. Most modern petrol engines now use fuel injection too — though the technology is quite different. While diesel must be injected at an exact point in that engine cycle, no such precision is needed in a petrol engine. However, the lack of lubricity in petrol means that the injectors themselves must be more sophisticated.

==== Carburetor ====
Simpler reciprocating engines continue to use a carburetor (carburettor in UK and Commonwealth English) to supply fuel into the cylinder. Although carburetor technology in automobiles reached a very high degree of sophistication and precision, from the mid-1980s it lost out on cost and flexibility to fuel injection. Simple forms of carburetor remain in widespread use in small engines such as lawn mowers and more sophisticated forms are still used in small motorcycles.

==== Fuel injection ====
Larger gasoline engines used in automobiles have mostly moved to fuel injection systems (see Gasoline Direct Injection). Diesel engines have always used fuel injection system because the timing of the injection initiates and controls the combustion.

Autogas engines use either fuel injection systems or open- or closed-loop carburetors.

==== Fuel pump ====
Most internal combustion engines now require a fuel pump. Diesel engines use an all-mechanical precision pump system that delivers a timed injection direct into the combustion chamber, hence requiring a high delivery pressure to overcome the pressure of the combustion chamber. Petrol fuel injection delivers into the inlet tract at atmospheric pressure (or below) and timing is not involved, these pumps are normally driven electrically. Gas turbine and rocket engines use electrical systems.

==== Other ====
Other internal combustion engines like jet engines and rocket engines employ various methods of fuel delivery including impinging jets, gas/liquid shear, preburners and others.

=== Oxidiser-Air inlet system ===
Some engines such as solid rockets have oxidisers already within the combustion chamber but in most cases for combustion to occur, a continuous supply of oxidiser must be supplied to the combustion chamber.

==== Naturally aspirated engines ====
When air is used with piston engines it can simply suck it in as the piston increases the volume of the chamber. However, this gives a maximum of 1 atmosphere of pressure difference across the inlet valves, and at high engine speeds the resulting airflow can limit potential output.

==== Superchargers and turbochargers ====
A supercharger is a "forced induction" system which uses a compressor powered by the shaft of the engine which forces air through the valves of the engine to achieve higher flow. When these systems are employed the maximum absolute pressure at the inlet valve is typically around 2 times atmospheric pressure or more.

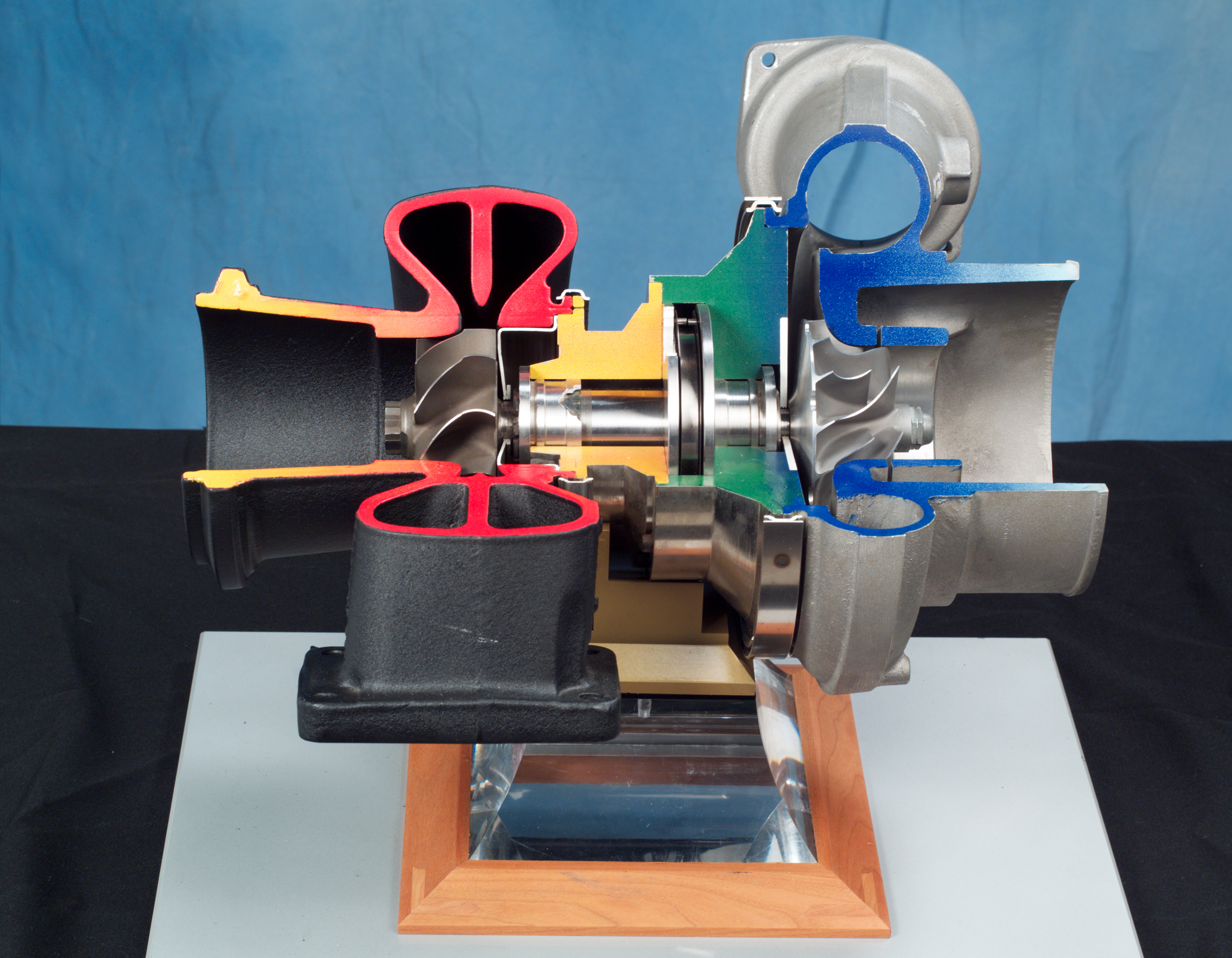
A cutaway of a turbocharger

Turbochargers are another type of forced induction system which has its compressor powered by a gas turbine running off the exhaust gases from the engine.

Turbochargers and superchargers are particularly useful at high altitudes and they are frequently used in aircraft engines.

Duct jet engines use the same basic system, but eschew the piston engine, and replace it with a burner instead.

==== Liquids ====
In liquid rocket engines, the oxidiser comes in the form of a liquid and needs to be delivered at high pressure (typically 10-230 bar or 1–23 MPa) to the combustion chamber. This is normally achieved by the use of a centrifugal pump powered by a gas turbine — a configuration known as a turbopump, but it can also be pressure fed.

== Parts ==
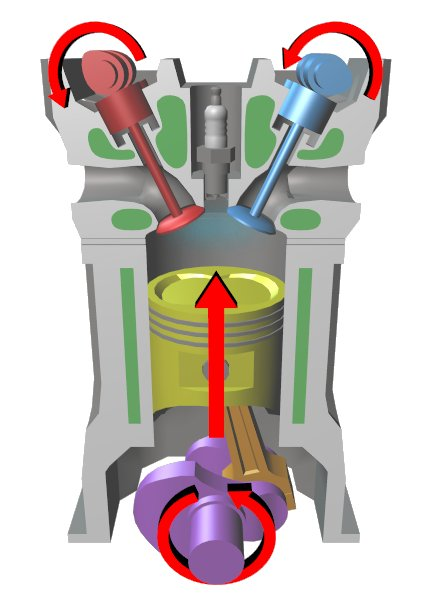
An illustration of several key components in a typical four-stroke engine.

For a four-stroke engine, key parts of the engine include the crankshaft (purple), connecting rod (orange), one or more camshafts (red and blue), and valves. For a two-stroke engine, there may simply be an exhaust outlet and fuel inlet instead of a valve system. In both types of engines there are one or more cylinders (grey and green), and for each cylinder there is a spark plug (darker-grey, gasoline engines only), a piston (yellow), and a crankpin (purple). A single sweep of the cylinder by the piston in an upward or downward motion is known as a stroke. The downward stroke that occurs directly after the air-fuel mix passes from the carburetor or fuel injector to the cylinder (where it is ignited) is also known as a power stroke.

A Wankel engine has a triangular rotor that orbits in an epitrochoidal (figure 8 shape) chamber around an eccentric shaft. The four phases of operation (intake, compression, power, and exhaust) take place in what is effectively a moving, variable-volume chamber.

=== Valves ===
All four-stroke internal combustion engines employ valves to control the admittance of fuel and air into the combustion chamber. Two-stroke engines use ports in the cylinder bore, covered and uncovered by the piston, though there have been variations such as exhaust valves.

==== Piston engine valves ====
In piston engines, the valves are grouped into 'inlet valves' which admit the entrance of fuel and air and 'outlet valves' which allow the exhaust gases to escape. Each valve opens once per cycle and the ones that are subject to extreme accelerations are held closed by springs that are typically opened by rods running on a camshaft rotating with the engines' crankshaft.

==== Control valves ====
Continuous combustion engines—as well as piston engines—usually have valves that open and close to admit the fuel and/or air at the startup and shutdown. Some valves feather to adjust the flow to control power or engine speed as well.

=== Exhaust systems ===
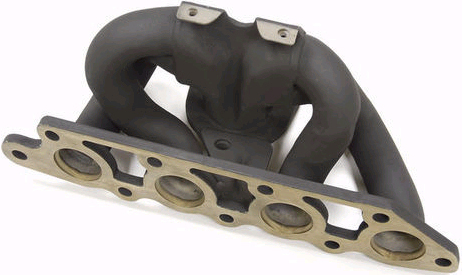
Exhaust manifold with ceramic plasma-sprayed system

Internal combustion engines have to effectively manage the exhaust of the cooled combustion gas from the engine. The exhaust system frequently contains devices to control both chemical and noise pollution. In addition, for cyclic combustion engines the exhaust system is frequently tuned to improve emptying of the combustion chamber. The majority of exhausts also have systems to prevent heat from reaching places which would encounter damage from it such as heat-sensitive components, often referred to as Exhaust Heat Management.

For jet propulsion internal combustion engines, the 'exhaust system' takes the form of a high velocity nozzle, which generates thrust for the engine and forms a collimated jet of gas that gives the engine its name.

=== Cooling systems ===
Combustion generates a great deal of heat, and some of this transfers to the walls of the engine. Failure will occur if the body of the engine is allowed to reach too high a temperature; either the engine will physically fail, or any lubricants used will degrade to the point that they no longer protect the engine. The lubricants must be clean as dirty lubricants may lead to over formation of sludge in the engines.

Cooling systems usually employ air (air-cooled) or liquid (usually water) cooling, while some very hot engines using radiative cooling (especially some rocket engines). Some high-altitude rocket engines use ablative cooling, where the walls gradually erode in a controlled fashion. Rockets in particular can use regenerative cooling, which uses the fuel to cool the solid parts of the engine.

=== Piston ===
A piston is a component of reciprocating engines. It is located in a cylinder and is made gas-tight by piston rings. Its purpose is to transfer force from expanding gas in the cylinder to the crankshaft via a piston rod and/or connecting rod. In two-stroke engines the piston also acts as a valve by covering and uncovering ports in the cylinder wall.

=== Propelling nozzle ===
For jet engine forms of internal combustion engines, a propelling nozzle is present. This takes the high temperature, high pressure exhaust and expands and cools it. The exhaust leaves the nozzle going at much higher speed and provides thrust, as well as constricting the flow from the engine and raising the pressure in the rest of the engine, giving greater thrust for the exhaust mass that exits.

=== Crankshaft ===
A crankshaft for a 4-cylinder engine

Most reciprocating internal combustion engines end up turning a shaft. This means that the linear motion of a piston must be converted into rotation. This is typically achieved by a crankshaft.

=== Flywheels ===
The flywheel is a disk or wheel attached to the crank, forming an inertial mass that stores rotational energy. In engines with only a single cylinder the flywheel is essential to carry energy over from the power stroke into a subsequent compression stroke. Flywheels are present in most reciprocating engines to smooth out the power delivery over each rotation of the crank and in most automotive engines also mount a gear ring for a starter. The rotational inertia of the flywheel also allows a much slower minimum unloaded speed and also improves the smoothness at idle. The flywheel may also perform a part of the balancing of the system and so by itself be out of balance, although most engines will use a neutral balance for the flywheel, enabling it to be balanced in a separate operation. The flywheel is also used as a mounting for the clutch or a torque converter in most automotive applications.

=== Starter systems ===
All internal combustion engines require some form of system to get them into operation. Most piston engines use a starter motor powered by the same battery as runs the rest of the electric systems. Large jet engines and gas turbines are started with a compressed air motor that is geared to one of the engine's driveshafts. Compressed air can be supplied from another engine, a unit on the ground or by the aircraft's APU. Small internal combustion engines are often started by pull cords. Motorcycles of all sizes were traditionally kick-started, though all but the smallest are now electric-start. Large stationary and marine engines may be started by the timed injection of compressed air into the cylinders — or occasionally with cartridges. Jump starting refers to assistance from another battery (typically when the fitted battery is discharged), while bump starting refers to an alternative method of starting by the application of some external force, e.g. rolling down a hill.

=== Heat shielding systems ===
These systems often work in combination with engine cooling and exhaust systems. Heat shielding is necessary to prevent engine heat from damaging heat-sensitive components. The majority of older cars use simple steel heat shielding to reduce thermal radiation and convection. It is now most common for modern cars are to use aluminium heat shielding which has a lower density, can be easily formed and does not corrode in the same way as steel. Higher performance vehicles are beginning to use ceramic heat shielding as this can withstand far higher temperatures as well as further reductions in heat transfer.

=== Lubrication systems ===
Internal combustions engines require lubrication in operation that moving parts slide smoothly over each other. Insufficient lubrication subjects the parts of the engine to metal-to-metal contact, friction, heat build-up, rapid wear often culminating in parts becoming friction welded together e.g. pistons in their cylinders. Big end bearings seizing up will sometimes lead to a connecting rod breaking and poking out through the crankcase.

Several different types of lubrication systems are used. Simple two-stroke engines are lubricated by oil mixed into the fuel or injected into the induction stream as a spray. Early slow-speed stationary and marine engines were lubricated by gravity from small chambers similar to those used on steam engines at the time — with an engine tender refilling these as needed. As engines were adapted for automotive and aircraft use, the need for a high power-to-weight ratio led to increased speeds, higher temperatures, and greater pressure on bearings which in turn required pressure-lubrication for crank bearings and connecting-rod journals. This was provided either by a direct lubrication from a pump, or indirectly by a jet of oil directed at pickup cups on the connecting rod ends which had the advantage of providing higher pressures as the engine speed increased.

=== Control systems ===
Most engines require one or more systems to start and shut down the engine and to control parameters such as the power, speed, torque, pollution, combustion temperature, and efficiency and to stabilise the engine from modes of operation that may induce self-damage such as pre-ignition. Such systems may be referred to as engine control units.

Many control systems today are digital, and are frequently termed FADEC (Full Authority Digital Electronic Control) systems.

=== Diagnostic systems ===
Engine On Board Diagnostics (also known as OBD) is a computerized system that allows for electronic diagnosis of a vehicles' powerplant. The first generation, known as OBD1, was introduced 10 years after the U.S. Congress passed the Clean Air Act in 1970 as a way to monitor a vehicles' fuel injection system. OBD2, the second generation of computerized on-board diagnostics, was codified and recommended by the California Air Resource Board in 1994 and became mandatory equipment aboard all vehicles sold in the United States as of 1996.Also done in all cars.

== See also ==
- jet engine
- piston engine
