= Mochishche Aerodrome =

Aerodrome in Novosibirsk, Russia

Coordinates: 55°10′10″N 83°08′41″E

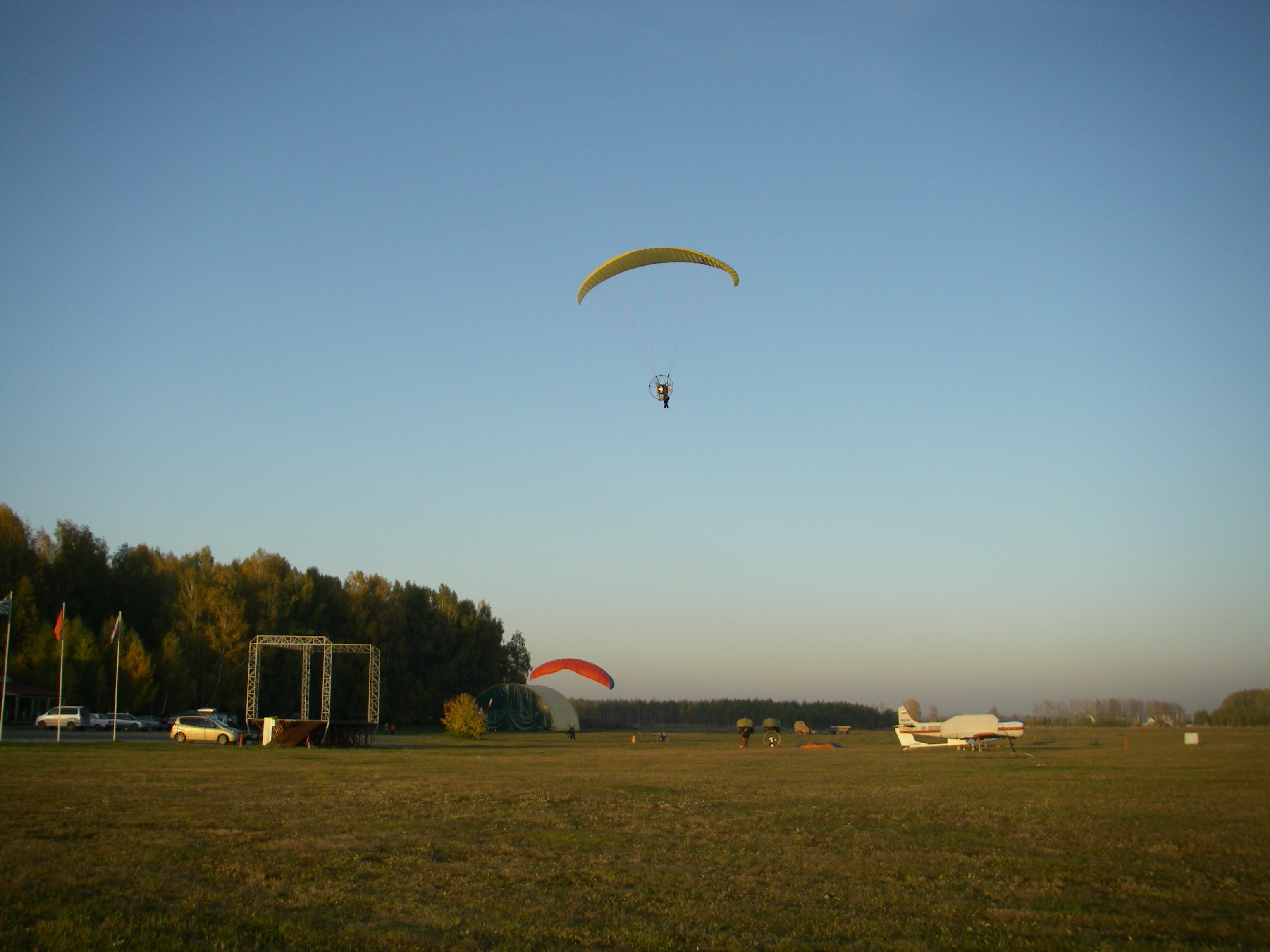

Mochishche Aerodrome (Russian: Аэродром «Мочище») is a sports aerodrome near Novosibirsk, Russia (12 km northeast of the city). It is used for basing and flying of general aviation aircraft, experimental aviation and parachute jumps.

== History ==
Since 2001, airshows are held at the airport every year.
