= Autogas for America =

American advocacy group promoting Autogas usage

- Formation: 2010; 16 years ago
- Founder: Stuart Weidie
- Founded at: Washington DC
- Type: Nonprofit advocacy group
- Purpose: Promote the use of autogas in the United States as an alternative fuel for cars
- Location: United States
- Origins: Founded during a National Propane Gas Association meeting
- Region served: United States
- Services: Pressure government and stakeholders
- Members: 100 (2024)
- Website: autogasforamerica.org

Autogas for America claims to be the unified voice of the autogas industry in the United States. Composed of autogas experts, transportation industry specialists and environmental advocates, Autogas for America says it "leverages industry cooperation to widen recognition of autogas among the U.S. public, media and government."

== History ==
Formed in 2010, the nonprofit organization has grown to more than 100 stakeholders. Autogas for America does not favor any particular equipment manufacturer or fuel supplier, including stakeholders from both OEM manufacturers like Roush CleanTech, a subsidiary of Roush Performance, and after-market conversion providers like Alliance AutoGas.

Autogas for America's platform includes advocating the use of propane autogas as an alternative vehicle fuel. The organization markets autogas' application to public and private fleets. Among its goals, the organization's website says, "Autogas for America will pursue legislation that promotes the use of clean Autogas," to include the long-term extensions of the 50-cent-per-gallon alternative fuel tax credit and the 30%, up to $30,000, alternative fuel infrastructure credit that were renewed only through 2011 in the Tax Relief, Unemployment Insurance Reauthorization, and Job Creation Act of 2010.
