= Autogas =

Liquefied petroleum gas when it is used as a fuel in internal combustion engines

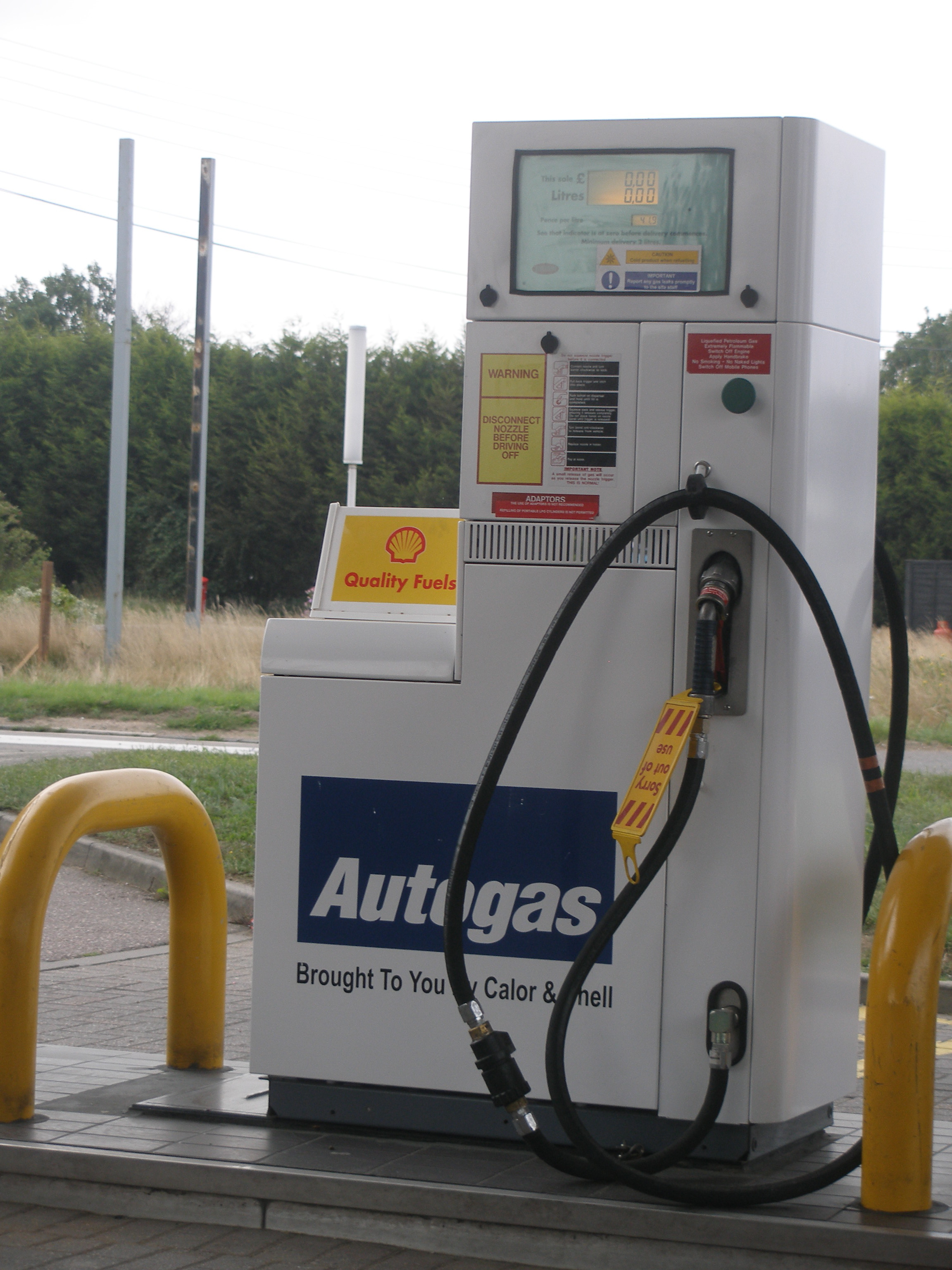
A Shell autogas refuelling station

Autogas is liquefied petroleum gas (LPG) used as a fuel in internal combustion engines, mainly in road vehicles. It is composed principally of propane and butane. The name varies by country: in the United Kingdom and Australia it is commonly called LPG, while in the United States it is usually known as propane or propane autogas.

Vehicles can either be manufactured for LPG use or converted from petrol. Some retain both fuel systems, allowing the driver to switch between LPG and petrol. Autogas installations range from older converter-and-mixer systems to vapour- and liquid-phase injection.

== Terminology variations and confusion ==
In countries where petroleum spirits is called petrol rather than gasoline, it is common for autogas to be simply referred to as gas. This can be confusing for people from countries where petrol is called gasoline, as they often use gas as an abbreviation of gasoline.

In the United States, autogas is more commonly known under the name of its primary constituent, propane. In 2010 the Propane Education and Research Council adopted the term "Propane Autogas" to refer to LPG used in on-road motor vehicles.

In the UK the terms LPG and autogas are used interchangeably. In Australia and the Netherlands, the common term is LPG. In Italy and France, GPL (an acronym for Italian: gas di petrolio liquefatto or French: gaz de pétrole liquéfié) is used. In Spain the term GLP (gas licuado del petróleo) is used.

In Asian countries, particularly those with historical American influences, such as the Philippines, the term autogas is not commonly recognised as a generic term, and the use of the terms LPG or autoLPG is more widely used by consumers, especially by taxi drivers, many of whom use converted vehicles. The converted vehicles are commonly called LPG vehicles or LPG cars.

== Difficulties with LPG as automotive fuel ==
Despite LPG being widely used as a fuel for cars, motorists in need of autogas can sometimes face difficulties, especially in remote areas and in places where supply and demand are low. Therefore, they may need to plan their journeys around access to stations where LPG can reliably be obtained. Some autogas fuel-systems handle this with parallel autogas and petrol mechanisms in vehicles – allowing either autogas or petrol to be used at any given time.

== Emissions ==
The emissions effects of using autogas instead of petrol vary by pollutant and driving conditions. A 2011 study comparing the same engine operating on petrol and LPG found that LPG reduced carbon monoxide emissions by 30% in the urban test cycle and 10% in the extra-urban cycle, nitrogen oxide emissions by 41% and 77% respectively, and carbon dioxide emissions by 10% and 11% respectively. A 2011 The Guardian article reported a well-to-wheel analysis estimating that LPG-fuelled vehicles produced 14% less carbon dioxide than petrol vehicles and 10% less than diesel vehicles.

== History ==
Internal combustion engines fuelled by gases date from at least 1823 with the work of Samuel Brown in London. By 1935 Hanover had an autogas station, and a trial run took place with trucks travelling between Moscow and Leningrad in the same year. Initial use depended largely on the types of different/alternative fuels available and on their cost. More widespread application of autogas in transport systems came in the 1970s, especially for taxis (notably in the Netherlands, Italy, Bangkok and Istanbul) and buses.

== Vehicle manufacturers ==
Toyota made a number of LPG-only engines in their 1970s M, R, and Y engine families.

A number of automobile manufacturers— Citroën, Fiat, Ford, Hyundai, General Motors (including Daewoo, Holden, Opel/Vauxhall, Saab), Maruti Suzuki, Peugeot, Renault (including Dacia), Skoda, Tata Motors, Toyota, Volvo, and more recently Volkswagen— have OEM bi-fuel models that will run equally well on both LPG and petrol. Holden Special Vehicles (HSV) offered bi-fuel models; however, the vehicles use a different system from that of their donor vehicles from Holden, with HSV using technology from Orbital Autogas Systems, which injects the autogas into the engine as a liquid instead of a gas for increased efficiency. Beginning in 2011, Holden's Commodore range (sedan, wagon and ute) was offered as a dedicated LPG vehicle, with an aluminium fuel tank in place of the petrol tank.

Petrol engined cars, trucks and buses which have not been fitted with LPG/autogas systems by the manufacturers can usually accept third party systems to enable them to use either LPG or petrol. ROUSH CleanTech manufactures designs, engineers, manufactures and installs propane autogas fuel systems for medium-duty Ford commercial vehicles and Type A and Type C Blue Bird school buses.

Vialle manufacture OEM LPG powered scooters and LPG powered mopeds that run equally well on LPG. Ford Australia have offered an LPG-only variant of their Falcon model since 2000.

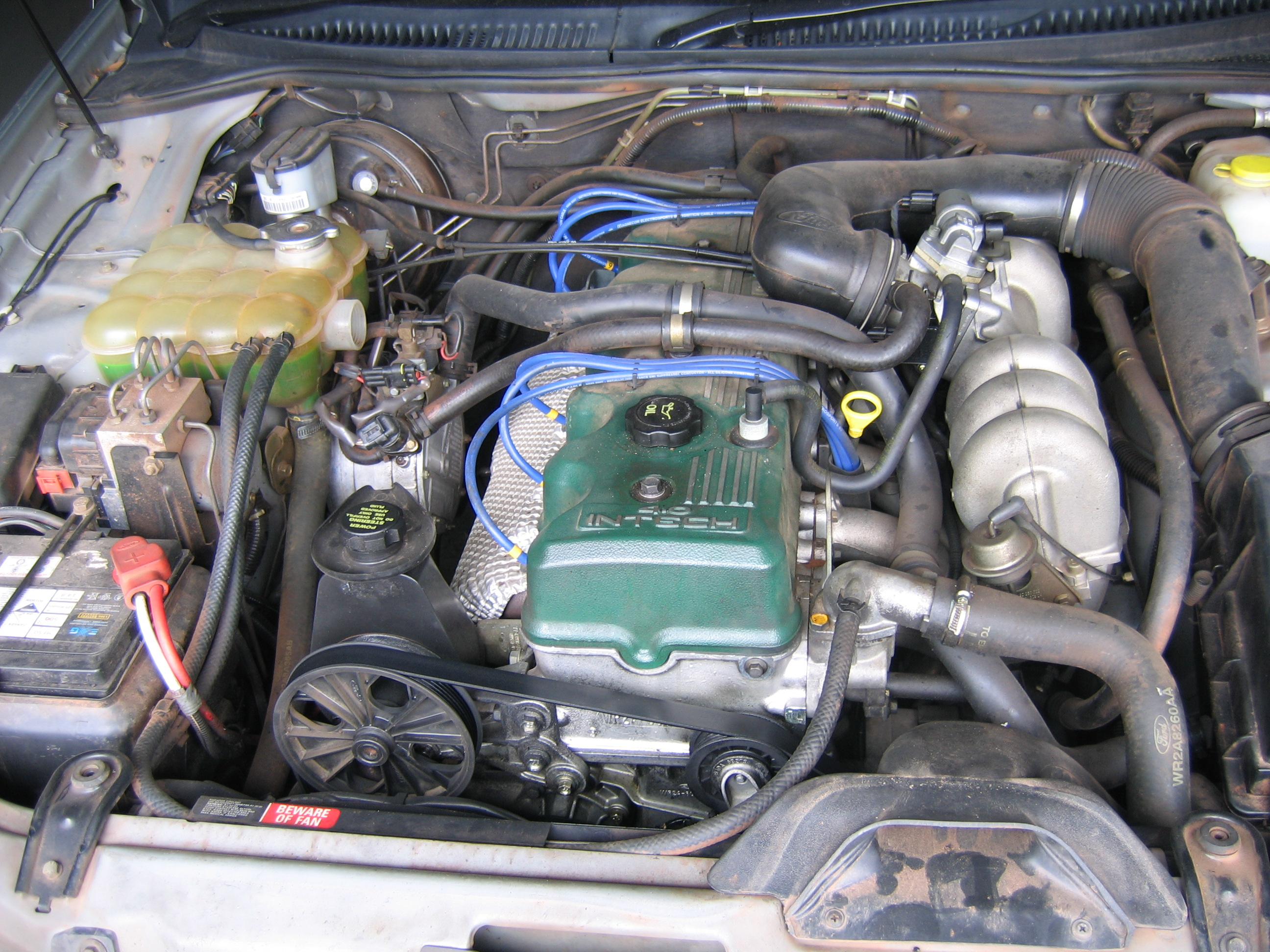
4.0-litre E-Gas straight-six engine of a 2001 Ford Falcon (AU)

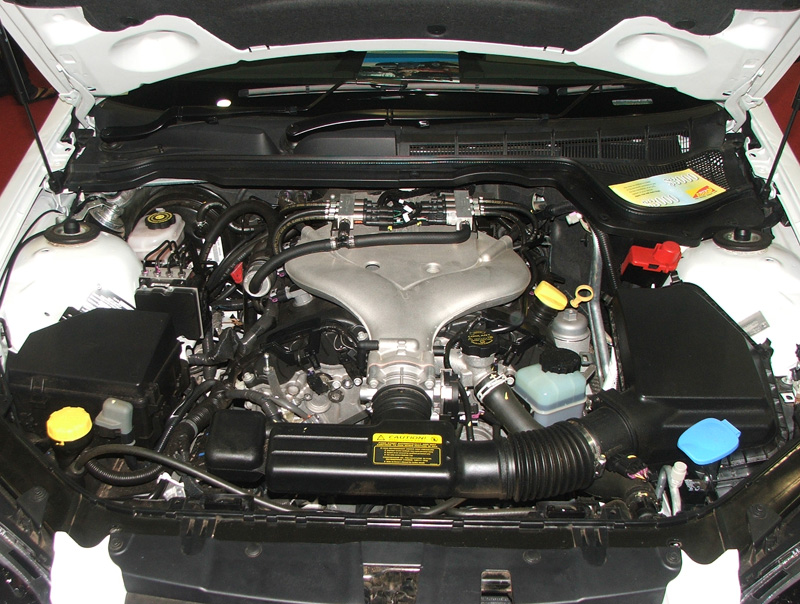
3.6-litre Alloytec bi-fuel (petrol and LPG) V6 engine of a 2006–2008 Holden Commodore (VE)

== Countries ==
Pie chart of 2020 autogas consumption

The World Liquid Gas Association reports that more than 27.8 million autogas vehicles are in use worldwide. It states that Turkey, Russia, South Korea, Poland, Ukraine and Italy together accounted for half of global autogas consumption in 2019.

Autogas is used in countries and territories including Australia, the European Union, Hong Kong, India, the Philippines, Northern Macedonia, South Korea, Serbia, Sri Lanka and Turkey. It is also available at larger petrol stations in several countries. In Armenia, for example, the transport ministry estimates as many as 20 to 30% of vehicles use autogas, because its price was reported to be less than half that of petrol and about 40% less than diesel. Rising oil-derived fuel prices were reported to have increased the price difference.

=== Algeria ===
Since the 1980s, the Algerian government has pursued a policy to promote the use of autogas in Algeria. The two main incentives for the government to put this policy into action were to take advantage of the large LPG production and to reduce urban pollution. At the end of 2019, there were approximately 500,000 autogas-powered vehicles on the roads, supported by over 1000 refuelling stations.

The Algerian government fixes the prices of all automotive fuels. Autogas is priced in Algeria at 61% of the price of diesel.

=== Australia ===
LPG was popular in Australia, because it was less than half the price of petrol in urban areas (approx A$0.59–0.75 per litre, as opposed to A$1.10-1.35 per litre for unleaded fuel and A$1.15-1.30 per litre for diesel, in February 2010), and it is locally produced.

The popularity of automotive LPG is declining, as more motorists purchase hybrid-electric cars. local car manufacturing that offered LPG as a factory option ceased, and a federal government excise on LPG commenced in 2011 making the fuel more expensive.

The two major local manufacturers, (Ford and Holden), when they used to manufacture cars in Australia (production ceasing in 2016 and 2017 respectively), had offered factory fitted autogas in some models of their locally made large cars and commercial vehicles. Mitsubishi Australia formerly manufactured factory-fitted autogas vehicles locally but ceased manufacturing in 2008. All factory autogas vehicles, with the exception of the E-Gas Ford Falcon model, were bi-fuel vehicles, meaning they have the capability to run on either petrol, autogas, or a combination.

Holden Special Vehicles offered a different autogas system from its parent, Holden, that injects the autogas into the engine as a liquid, allowing for higher efficiency.

All Ford LPG vehicles that were locally made used liquid injected LPG and developed 3 kW more than the petrol equivalent.

There are approximately 310,000 autogas-powered cars on Australia's roads. The number of LPG/Dual fuel vehicles continues to decrease, falling by 34.2% (161,191) between 2013 and 2018. Over the same period, the number of registered electric vehicles increased by 159.2% to 8,334.

There has been a corresponding reduction in the number of LPG refuelling locations – less than 2,900 in 2018, down from 3,500 several years prior.

Whilst historically autogas was excise-free, it began being imposed on all vehicle fuels that were not previously subject to excise in 2011 and was added incrementally up to 2015. The excise on autogas started at 2.5 cents per litre in 2011 and reached 12.5 cents per litre in 2015. By comparison, the excise on petrol remained at its existing 38 cents per litre. The excise was accompanied by a subsidy that was implemented in 2006 for private motorists, paying either A$2,000 to convert their existing vehicle to autogas, or A$1,000 for purchasing a new vehicle that was manufactured to operate on autogas. The subsidy does not apply to business vehicles or vehicles with a gross vehicle mass of over 3,500 kilograms. In addition to the subsidy provided by the Australian federal government, the Western Australian government also provides a A$1,000 subsidy under the long-running LPG subsidy scheme.

=== Belgium ===
The use of autogas (called LPG in both French and Dutch speaking Belgium) was once very popular in Belgium, thanks to the subsidies given by the government to install conversion kits. Since, 2003, when the subsidies disappeared, the number of cars running on LPG has decreased and the number of cars running on diesel has increased. This was partly due to the tax incentives to purchase diesel cars. In recent years, the use of autogas as a vehicle fuel has accounted for less than 2% of vehicle fuel use in Belgium. At the end of 2003, there was an estimate of 93,000 autogas-powered vehicles on Belgium, supported by 600 refuelling stations. In 2010 there were 33,482 cars equipped with LPG and in 2012 it went down to 22,265. Since 2012 there has been a slight increase in the number of autogas-powered vehicles of around 14%. This increase is mainly due to the phasing-out of the tax incentives to buy diesel cars. The number of refuelling stations equipped with LPG has increased and in 2012 there were 727 stations.

In Belgium, autogas is totally free of excises, but not of VAT. As of June 2019, the price of a litre of autogas is around a third of the price of a litre of diesel, at that time. The price difference with neighbouring France has been associated with cross-border LPG refuelling.

To compensate for the loss of tax revenue, Belgian cars equipped with LPG pay a higher road tax than petrol or compressed natural gas (CNG) cars. In a Government's effort to incentivate the use of LPG cars, the registration tax paid by LPG cars is lower than the registration tax of CNG, petrol and diesel cars because. Thus since 2013, brand-new LPG cars (and LPG cars with less than one year of age) benefit from an important reduction in registration duty.

Despite its exemption from excise duty and lower registration tax, autogas use in Belgium has not returned to its 1990s levels. Belgium does not provide with subsidies for LPG or CNG car installations. The current subsidies provided to CNG car installations since 2014 are provided by the natural gas private industry.

Since 2013, OPEL is the only distributor that still sells brand-new factory-installed LPG cars in Belgium.

=== Bulgaria ===
Autogas consumption in Bulgaria accounted for 14% the total fuel consumption in 2003, an amount which has tripled since 1999. By the end of 2003, there were an estimated 195,000 autogas-powered vehicles on the road, with around 1,500 refuelling stations. It was also used by commercial operators in Bulgaria: 90% of minibuses and taxicabs were able to run on the fuel. Vehicles originally manufactured to operate on autogas are virtually non-existent in Bulgaria, so the vast majority of the vehicles are third-party conversions.

=== Canada ===
Autogas, or auto propane as it is more commonly referred to in Canada, is the most popular alternative fuel in the country. It is primarily used by high consumption public and private fleets (taxis, couriers, school buses and transit vehicles).

Canadian auto propane demand began to increase dramatically in the 1980s after the Government of Canada introduced a CA$400 grant in 1981 for consumers to convert their vehicles to run on propane in response to national energy security concerns. Some provinces also offered various grants and incentives for propane conversions. Vehicle conversions reached approximately 200,000 in the early 1990s, and auto propane was estimated to be available at over 5,000 locations. The Federal Government grant was discontinued in 1985. Auto propane demand began to decline in the early 1990s due to changes in technology and relatively low cost of gasoline and diesel fuel.

An increase in demand has occurred since 2010, as a result of lower prices relative to gasoline and diesel fuel and improved technology. In 2014, it is estimated that the number of auto propane vehicles on the road in Canada is between 25,000 – 50,000 and the number of fuelling stations is 2,000. In 2014, auto propane amounted to 7% of the total domestic propane consumption in Canada.

Fleet operators have used auto propane partly because reported prices in many Canadian cities were about 40% lower than those of gasoline and diesel. Auto propane also has different fuel tax treatment and is exempt from the federal excise tax and is taxed at a lower rate than gasoline and diesel in every province and territory. Average auto propane prices are reported by Natural Resources Canada.

The only OEM vehicle available for purchase in Canada is the Blue Bird Corporation Propane-Powered Vision. Others are pending. Aftermarket conversions represent the balance of the market. These conversions are typically performed on gasoline vehicles and may be either mono fuel (propane only) or dual fuel (operate on propane or gasoline). These conversions are performed in accordance to provincial and territorial regulations and the Canadian Standards Association (CSA) B149.5 – Installation code for propane fuel systems and tanks on highway vehicles. Another propane option gaining some popularity is diesel blend where propane is blended into the diesel fuel as it is injected into the combustion chamber. This reduces diesel consumption and improves emissions.

The cost to convert a vehicle to propane in Canada is approximately CA$4,000 to CA$6,000 for the current vapour or liquid fuel injected technology, and fleet users can expect a payback on the conversion cost within a year. Converting a vehicle to propane is approximately half the cost of converting a vehicle to natural gas in Canada. In just about every case, a propane dispensing facility will cost significantly less money than any other fuel, including gasoline or diesel. Installing a propane fuelling station will typically cost up to 95% less than a natural gas fuelling station. A typical 2,000 USWG dispenser will cost approximately CA$30,000 and a larger high volume dispenser with a 5,000 USWG tank will cost CA$55,000 to CA$75,000, not including site costs.

=== China ===
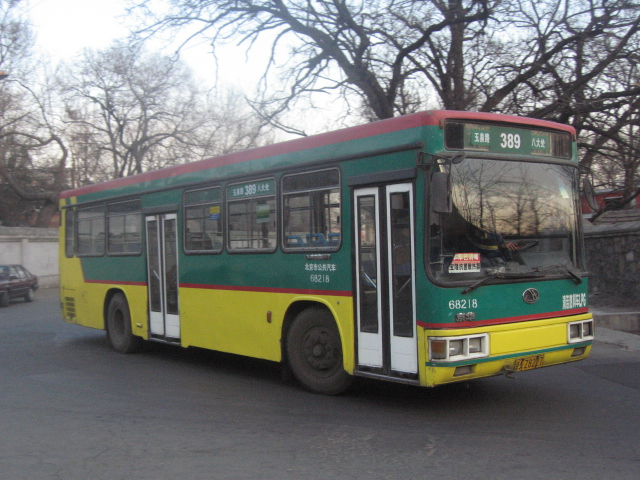
Beijing Bus used LPG buses from 1999 to 2006.

Autogas consumption in China has grown rapidly since the 1990s, has slowed down in the early 2000s, but has started to grow again in recent years. In 2009, autogas refuelling stations have spread to 25 cities and has become a major alternative fuel in China. Motorcycles account for a large portion of the autogas, with over 260,000 autogas motorcycles in Shanghai alone. In Shenyang, the local government is encouraging public transport to convert to autogas, and as of 2009 over 160,000 taxicabs run on the fuel as well as over 2,500 buses. The city of Guangzhou accounted for 46.56% of national autogas consumption in 2009. Only 24% of China's Liquefied Petroleum Gas is produced domestically.

=== Croatia ===
As of 2008, approximately 30,000 Croatians drove using autogas, which at the time was available from 90 stations throughout the nation. In 2009, it was estimated that there were 60,000 autogas-powered cars on Croatia's roads, and in 2010, it is estimated that 150,000 drivers in Croatia were using autogas. This recent increase in popularity has largely been attributed to the lower price of autogas compared to petrol or diesel.

In 2009, Croatia exported 51% of domestically produced liquefied petroleum gas (LPG), leaving only 49% for consumption. Out of that 49%, 45% of domestically sold LPG is used as autogas. Damir Stambuk from the Croatian Ministry of Economy, which is also responsible for energy, said that Croatia is not yet ready for a regular autogas market due to a small network of stations, but in the future it will be.

=== Czech Republic ===
At the end of 2003, the roads of the Czech Republic had an estimated 145,000 autogas vehicles with 350 refuelling stations.

=== Denmark ===
Autogas has become uncommon in Denmark since taxes have risen, making LPG more expensive than unleaded petrol. As a result, there is no customer demand, leaving only around 13 refuelling stations. The stations are run by Shell, YX, OK, Uno-X, Q8 and Statoil.

=== France ===
It was estimated that France would have over 62,500 autogas vehicles on the road by the end of 2010. By the end of 2003, there were an estimated 190,000 autogas vehicles in use with almost 1,900 refuelling stations. In 2005, autogas accounted for around 0.4% of the total automotive fuel use.

=== Germany ===
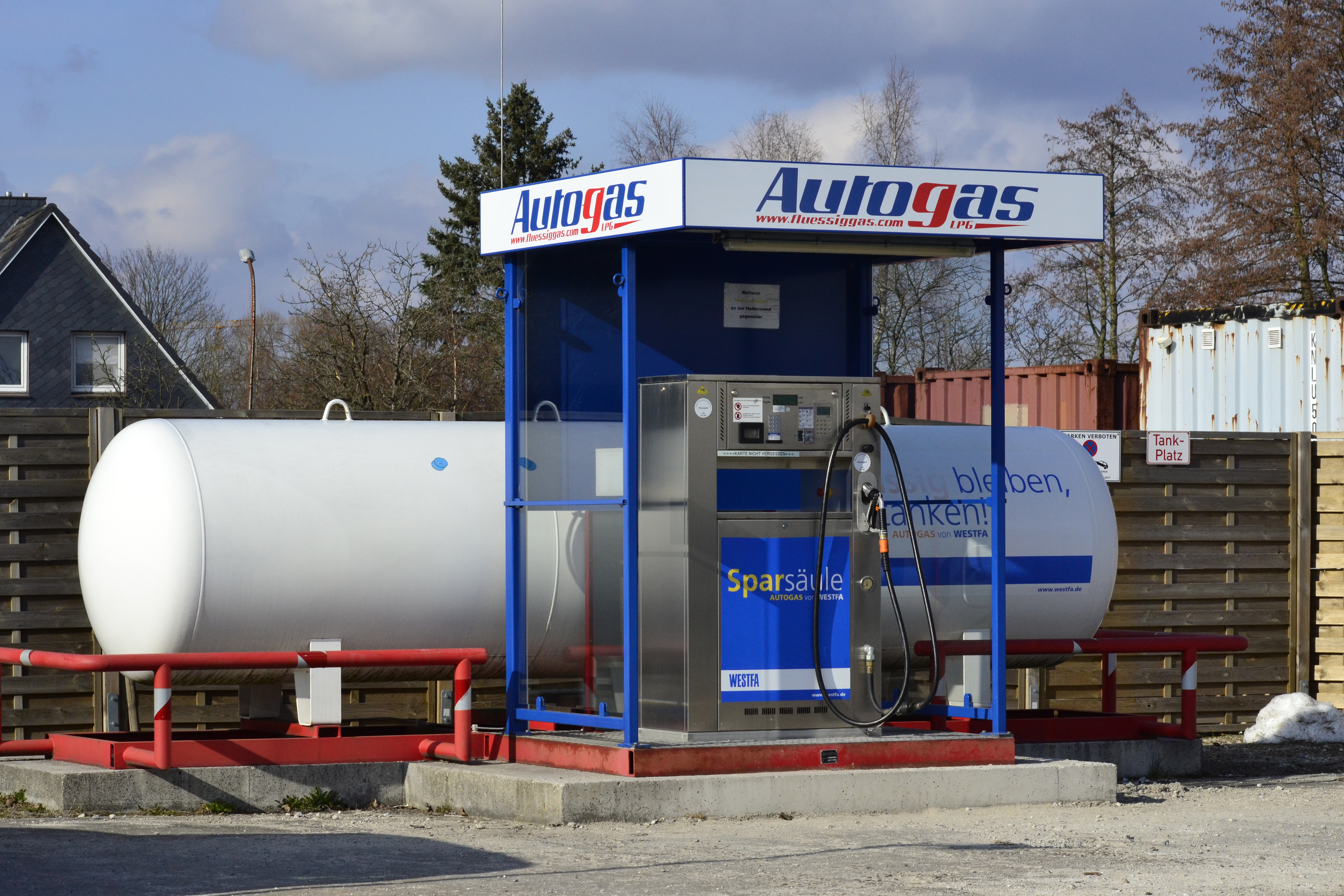
Unmanned LPG-only station in Germany, payment per girocard

In Germany, the fuel is called Autogas as well (CNG is known as Erdgas). There were 6,700 fuel stations selling autogas in 2014, supplying about 500,000 registered gas-fuelled cars (1.1 per cent of all cars in Germany). mylpg.eu lists 7.240 stations in 2016. In addition to filling stations, numerous suppliers of industrial gas run dedicated autogas stations on their premises. Most filling pumps use the ACME adapter but DISH can also be found. Special fuel tax rates make autogas rather cheap in Germany (about €0.52 per litre while 95-octane unleaded is €1.40 per litre).

=== Greece ===
LPG or autogas, despite having existed for about three decades in Greece (initially used only in taxis, in 1999 it was legalised for all vehicles), increased in use during the preceding three to five years, mostly due to the increase in petrol prices. The number of refuelling points as well as conversion workshops is rapidly increasing. Currently (2012) there are about 404 filling stations. Some companies (e.g., Fiat, Toyota, Subaru, Opel, Chevrolet) offer some models with bi-fuel capability. The price at the end of 2012 was about 55% of the price of petrol. The most common term used for it is ygraerio, meaning "liquid gas".

=== Hong Kong ===
In Hong Kong, all taxicabs bar electric taxis rely on autogas. Many public light buses also rely on autogas.

=== Ireland ===
Autogas was widely used in Ireland during the early 1980s, and the country had a large and extensive network of refuelling points. It proved popular at the time particularly as Ireland was in a deep recession for much of the 1980s. However autogas fell out of favour in the late 1990s and 2000s due to unreliable early autogas systems and as the country experienced massive economic growth and unprecedented wealth demand for conversions and autogas subsequently dwindled.

However, as Ireland once again entered economic recession, austerity measures and increased fuel taxation saw the price of traditional Diesel and petrol fuels skyrocket to record highs. This coincided with a small increase in autogas use in Ireland in 2012 with new conversion outlets and refuelling points opening again. It has been re-introduced to Ireland by the new Polish diaspora living in the country drawing upon their knowledge and expertise from Europe's biggest autogas market.

There is a much larger market for Autogas in Northern Ireland, due to UK Government supports. As at 2026, there were currently 56 LPG outlets on the island of Ireland with 20 in Northern Ireland and 36 in the Republic of Ireland.

=== Italy ===
Autogas is used in Italy. With over 1,000,000 autogas vehicles on the road, it is the second largest autogas market in the European Union, after Poland. Italy was one of the first countries in the world to introduce autogas, which happened in the 1950s. In the first half of 2010 alone, more than 170,000 new autogas cars were registered. In 2008, two-thirds of General Motors vehicles sold in Italy were reported to be autogas-capable. Self fill is not permitted in Italy.

=== Japan ===
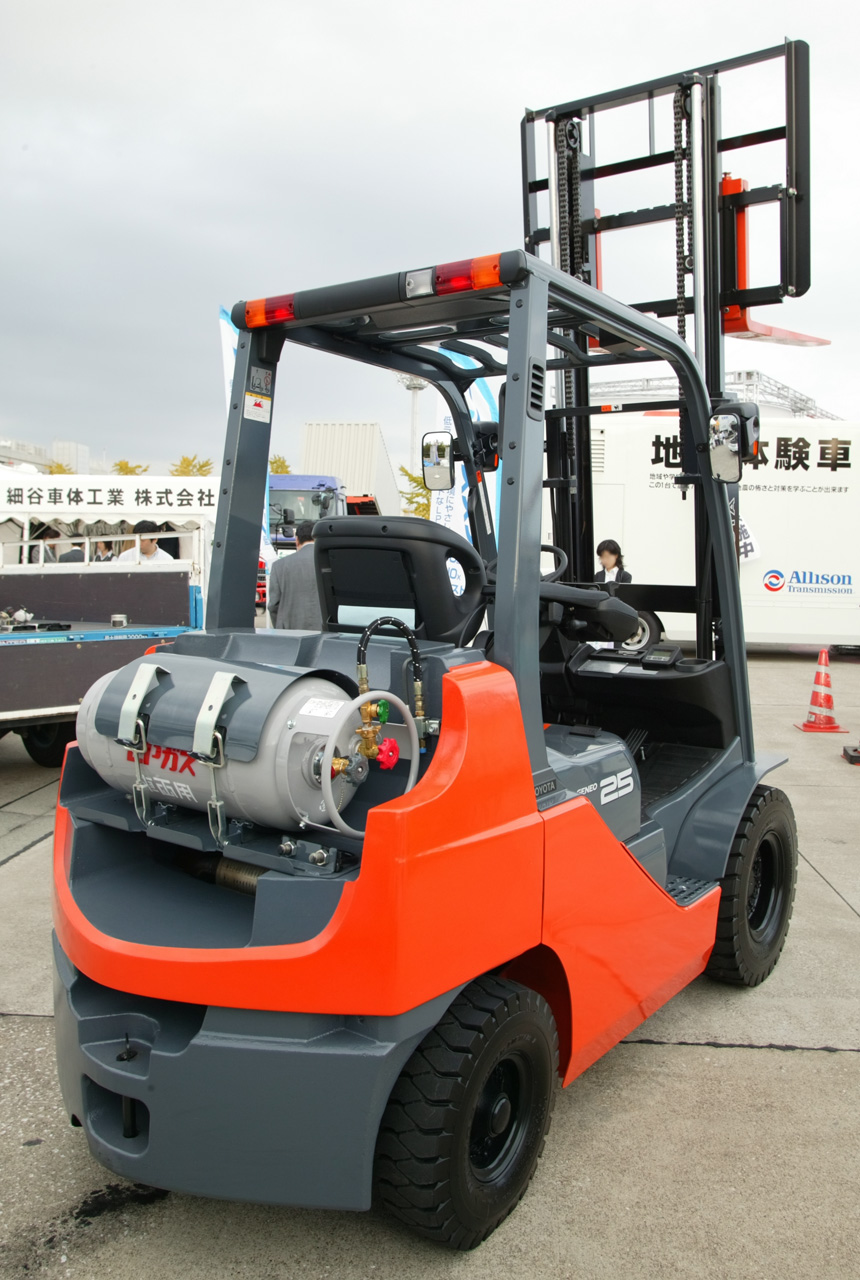
An autogas-powered forklift in Japan

As of 2013, Japan has about 280,000 autogas vehicles on the road, which is less than in recent years. However, the number of autogas vehicles on Japan's roads has been very unstable. The first autogas taxicabs were introduced in Japan in the 1960s and 1970s. With a sharp decline in the 1990s, the number started to rise again in 2003. Between 2004 and 2010, the number dropped. The vast majority of autogas vehicles on Japanese roads are taxicabs or commercial vehicles. This is why, in 2010, the Japan LP Gas Association started an initiative to encourage corporations and motorists alike to switch to autogas vehicles. The initiative involves 27,000 Japanese retailers to introduce an autogas vehicle into their fleet every three years. Many of these corporations already have autogas vehicles, but Makoto Arahata from the Japanese LP Gas Association says that there is still much room for improvement.

=== Lithuania ===
Lithuania is one of the countries with the highest rates of autogas use in Europe. Autogas is widely available in Lithuania. The distribution of most car brands are in the hands of the Polish distributors, therefore factory-installed LPG in brand-new cars are as common and widely available as they are in Poland.

=== Malta ===
Autogas was introduced to Malta on 22 May 2012 by Liquigas of Italy. The first filling station is located at the Malta International Airport.

=== Netherlands ===
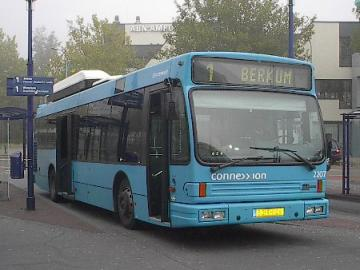
Dutch bus on LPG. Note the white gas tanks on the roof of the bus.

Use of autogas has varied in the Netherlands. It went up in the 1980s and has decreased ever since, except for an increase in 2005. In 2010, there are around 220,000 autogas vehicles on the road (total cars being a little less than 8 million).

Autogas is sold at most fuel stations, stations in urban areas may not supply it due to safety regulations with regard to LPG storage tanks. The 'Dutch Bayonet' is the standard filling device used.

The road tax on autogas vehicles can be up to 2 times that of petrol powered vehicles. On the modern third generation (G3) autogas systems, the difference on tax is zero for cars up to 850 kg, but increases for heavier cars. The diesel tax is twice the petrol tax. Because the price of autogas is less than half that of petrol, fitting a car with an LPG system is only economically feasible at more than around 10,000 km/year.

=== New Zealand ===
LPG has modest popularity in New Zealand among road users, and reached its peak during the period immediately following the oil crises of the 1970s. As part of his Think Big policies to encourage energy self-sufficiency, Rob Muldoon heavily subsidised the construction of LPG infrastructure during the late 1970s and early 1980s.

=== Pakistan ===
LPG was allowed to be used as an automotive fuel in 2005 and first Autogas station became operative in 2010 located at Sialkot. Up until 2014 there were only four Autogas stations operating in Pakistan serving around 1000 vehicles. LPG failed to attract attention of the investors and customers due to extremely cheap prices of CNG as Pakistan had huge Natural Gas reserves. Pakistan in a decade became the largest consumer of CNG. This impacted Pakistan's reserves in a negative way and they receded in a quick span. In November 2013 Oil and Gas Regulatory Authority issued about 40 NoC's for setting up LPG Autogas stations mainly to PSO, a State owned Petroleum giant. However, in December 2013 Oil and Gas Regulatory Authority (OGRA) contrary to the rest of the world where LPG is promoted, declared LPG a risk to public safety thus banned LPG to be used in Public transport vehicles, thus closing the era of LPG in Pakistan even before it started.

=== Poland ===
Polish road sign indicating an Autogas station

Poland has one of the longest-established autogas markets in Europe. It is the country with the highest rate of LPG use per capita, higher even than Italy. In 2011, there were 6050 autogas refuelling stations and 2,500,000 autogas vehicles on the road. The number of autogas vehicles in Poland increased by 8% in 2011, however autogas sales decreased by 3.7%. This is mostly due to older vehicles being replaced with newer, more fuel efficient ones. Almost half of Poland's LPG comes from Russia. Most of the Polish distributors offer brand-new factory installed LPG cars of mostly all brands.

=== Russia ===
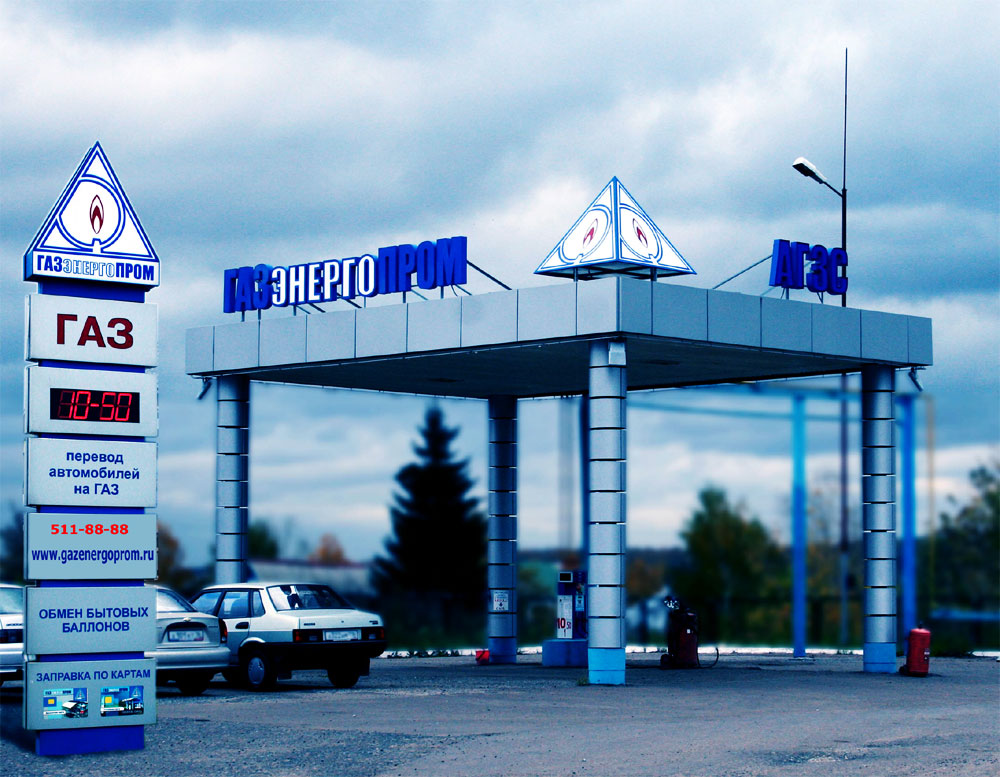
LPG-station in Kazan. The entrance stele says "газ" ("gas"), which in Russian is understood both as LPG and natural gas.

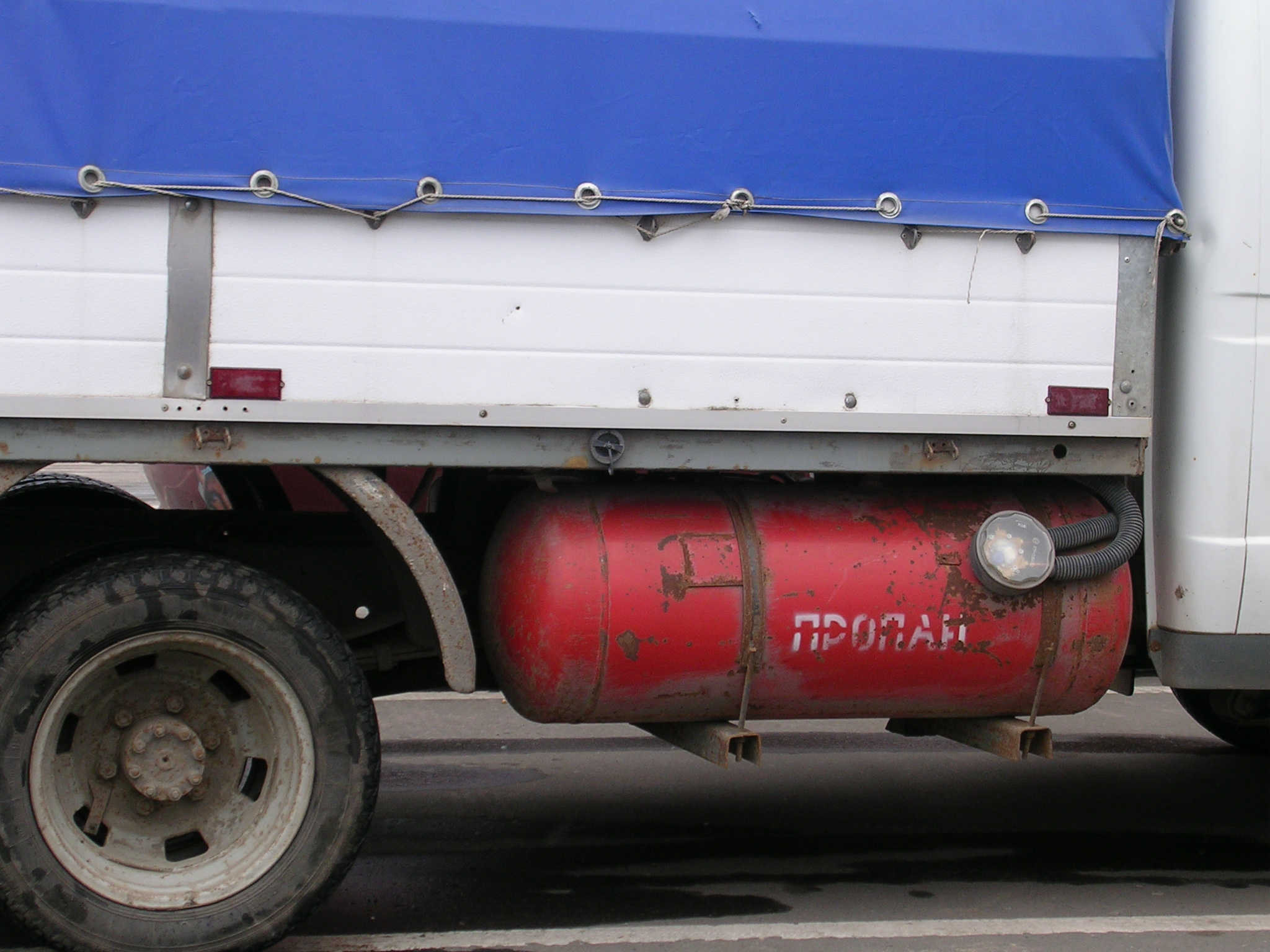
A GAZelle powered by propane. The Russian word "пропан" means "propane".

Autogas is widely used in Russia. In its modern form it has been used since the 1970s, when high oil prices and difficulties in economically producing lightweight diesel engines motivated the CPSU to try autogas in light trucks and buses with carburettor engines. There are two types of autogas equipment and autogas stations as well: LPG (propane-butane mix) and compressed natural gas (CNG, methane). Natural gas is stored at a higher pressure than LPG (200 bar vs. 10 bar for LPG).

The main consumer of LPG is commercial light-weight cargo transport (so as GAZelles in Russia are mostly LPG-powered). There are some community supported sources where people post gas station locations on the map. These sources may be used by some travellers going to Russia by car. First limited series of vehicles driven by multi-fuel including methane has appeared in the middle of the 20th century.

As of 2019, the number of autogas vehicles in Russia is actively growing. Some are built in the factory to use autogas and some are retrofitted existing vehicles. The average cost of a litre of petrol and diesel fuel in Russia is about 45 ₽ per litre. The cost of a litre of LPG is from 24 ₽ to 30 ₽, while fuel consumption is almost the same. In 2022, LPG prices fell down since January to 16-17 ₽ per litre, or even till 11-12 ₽ in some regions. Incentives have been provided for vehicle conversions to autogas. The availability of methane and propane refuelling stations differs. LPG users have reported lower operating costs but also drawbacks, including the space occupied by cylinders. For example, if an older "Volga" costs about 30,000 ₽, then its gasification can cost twice as much. But gasification of new cars as already mentioned in the article is possible directly from the factory or by official dealers of car brands.

CNG is more commonly used for commercial passenger transport (taxis, city buses). Although the Russian government subsidise conversion of petrol-powered vehicles to CNG by reimbursement of the majority of its price (CNG equipment costs twice more as LPG), it is not popular among private car owners because CNG tanks are much larger than LPG tanks and CNG stations are not common (LPG stations are as common as petrol and diesel stations).

Gas cylinders are painted red so that they cannot be confused with other cylinders.

=== Serbia ===
Serbia has a well-developed autogas market. Many petrol-powered vehicles from the 1980s, 1990s and early 2000s, both locally made cars such as Yugos and imports from Western Europe, have been converted to LPG. Autogas systems used in Serbia are mostly from Italian companies like Lovato and Tartarini. As of August 2014, LPG is approximately 40% cheaper per litre than petrol. It is available at petrol stations in the cities and along major routes, as well as some dedicated stations.

=== South Korea ===
South Korea had the world's largest Autogas market, which peaked in 2010. As of 2021, the country has a fleet of 1.96 million registered autogas-powered cars, with 1,992 refuelling stations. A large portion of the autogas fleet is light-duty vehicles used for commercial ends, such as taxis and rental cars.

=== Spain ===
Autogas (called GLP in Spain) was restricted by law to taxis and public transport buses for many decades. In recent years the market has been liberalised and autogas has been made available to all kinds of vehicles. The Spanish government subsidises the installations of autogas in cars and the purchase of brand-new factory-installed autogas cars. There are many factory-installed autogas brand-new cars available for purchase. While the number of autogas-powered cars is increasing every year, it is still low. The main barrier for a major expansion of the number of autogas-powered cars is that the number of refuelling stations for autogas is also still low, but it is increasing quickly too. By the end of 2015 there were 342 stations selling autogas in Spain. Spain is currently the only country using the new EU-wide common standard connector for autogas, the Euroconnector or Euronozzle adapter. The Euronozzle adapter was supposed to replace the current three different LPG filling systems (ACME, Bajonet and Dish) in Europe, but that would be expensive, so investments in such a change-over have not started yet. Before Euronozzle, Spain used a form of Bajonet. Spain's neighbouring countries France and Portugal continue to use Dish adapters for filling vehicles up with LPG.

=== Thailand ===
Thailand has for over 15 years run LPG taxi cabs in Bangkok, though autos and buses had erroneously labelled NGV stickers when in fact, they were LPG. A low cost local modification industry had sprung up in Thailand, with costs of conversion as low as US$800, as well as strong local know-how to avoid its major safety issues. By 2008, half of all taxicabs had switched from gasoline to LPG by low cost local modification. Despite a government push, the number of LPG vehicles continues to grow and outpace NGVs. The number of autogas vehicles has continues to see high growth, despite a push for operators to switch to NGV (CNG), there has been considerable resistance due to inherent costs. As of January 2013, Thailand has 1,014,000 LPG fuelled vehicles, and consumed 606,000 tonnes in 2012 of LPG, while 483 stations serve some 380,000 CNG vehicles.

=== Turkey ===
Turkey has the highest percentage of autogas vehicles in the world. Some 37% of passenger cars run on autogas, and autogas consumption now exceeds petrol consumption. The Turkish government regulated the autogas price to provide consumers with a net economic advantage of 20–35%. As of the end of 2010, there are 8,500 autogas fuelling stations around the country and market growth has been supported by a network of 1,000 licensed conversion shops.

According to the Turkish Statistics Institute's report, the nation had over 16,500,000 vehicles in January 2012. 50.3% are passenger vehicles. 16.2% light weight trucks, 15.7% motorcycles, 9.2% tractors, 4.6% heavy weight trucks, 2.5% mini buses for transportation, 1.4% buses and 0.1% special purpose vehicles.

Currently, average 50,000 new generation cars are sold per month.

LPG is dominantly used in Turkey as an autogas while there are only around 500 CNG fuelled cars and there are only two CNG filling stations.

In Turkey, Diesel vehicles are usually not converted to LPG because of unsuccessful applications in the past. For that reason, installations are often not made to light and heavy weight trucks, tractors, bus and mini-buses and motorcycles, because the owners of conversion workshops are fearful of the risks.

8.3 million LPG cars are passenger vehicles. 33% of the passenger cars (2,739,000) are diesel powered and 67% are petrol powered (5,561,000). As there is no conversion to diesel cars, among 5,561,000 petrol powered passenger cars, According to the reports of the MMO, (Chamber of Mechanical Engineers, authorised to check emissions and licences) there were 3.1 million LPG fuelled vehicles by the end of the year 2011.

This means more than 55% of petrol powered passenger vehicles are already converted to LPG.

Conversions initially involved mainly carburetted engines. LPG systems have also been fitted to newer vehicles.

High taxation of petrol and diesel has been cited as a factor in LPG vehicle conversions in Turkey. Reported fuel-cost savings of LPG relative to petrol and diesel have varied over time.

Turkish manufacturers began producing autogas conversion kits and tanks in the 1990s. Italian companies also supplied systems through local firms.

=== Ukraine ===
Ukraine is one of biggest consumers of autogas in the world. In 2021 Ukraine was on 5th place on volumes of autogas consumption with 1.8 million tons of LPG. Many petrol engines vehicles are converted, both made domestically such as ZAZ and imported cars. In 2021 2,66 milions of passenger cars, which is around 25% of all cars in Ukraine, has been working on LPG, mostly being converted from petrol engines to dual petrol-LPG engines.

High conversion rates been caused by economy reasons, as of 2026, LPG is approximately 2 times cheaper per litre than petrol, which is gives 30-35% of fuel savings.

LPG conversion is avaliable at specialized gas service stations for most petrol engines, including old carburetor engines and injector engines of wide variety. Ukraine requires to certify gas conversion kits installed, and replacement of the vehicle registration certificate with a note on LPG system installation. Certification norms requies clearly visible label "Gas" or "LPG" on the car and gas container of red color.

Gas itself, usually labeled as "Propane-Butane", is widely available at most of petrol stations, as well as some dedicated stations. In total gas is avaliable at 70-80% of stations nation-wide.

=== United Kingdom ===
According to the LPG trade association in the UK there are about 1500 refuelling stations that cater for the 160,000 LPG powered vehicles on UK roads. This represents less than 1% of vehicles. The only Government incentive to use LPG is the lower road fuel tax applied to LPG compared to petrol. In January 2012, the reported price difference was about 60 pence per litre. Technology has reached the point where almost all conversions are 'Sequential Vapour Injection', and in the UK there is a large number of kits at different prices and specifications.

=== United States ===
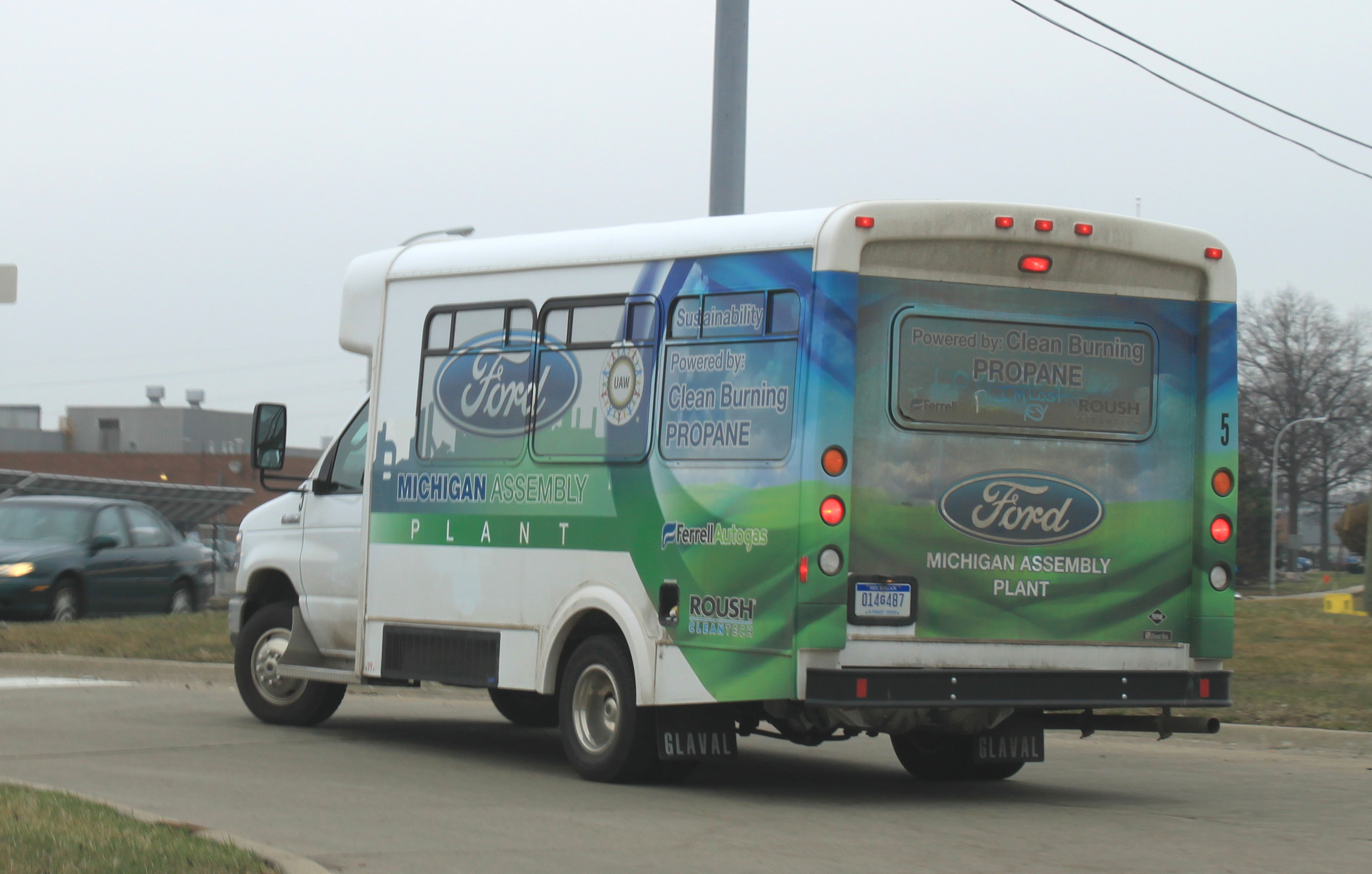
Propane-powered Ford van in Wayne, Michigan

As of February 2012, the United States has more than 147,000 autogas vehicles on the road, accounting for just 2% of the world's total and as of June 2013, the United States has 2,843 autogas fuelling stations. The U.S. Department of Energy maintains a locator for autogas and other alternative fuel fuelling stations. The cost of converting a car to use petrol or autogas at a turn of a knob starts from US$3,000. Industry sources reported that 90% of autogas used in the United States was domestically produced. In 2005, a provision was enacted that placed a 50-cent per gallon tax credit on propane autogas as part of H.R. 4853, making it $1 per gallon cheaper than petrol on average. The alternative fuel credit was extended in 2010 and remained in effect until the end of 2011.

Autogas for America is a lobbying group for the autogas industry in the United States.

Piston-powered small aircraft that use autogas require a Supplemental Type Certificate issued by the United States Federal Aviation Administration.

== System types ==
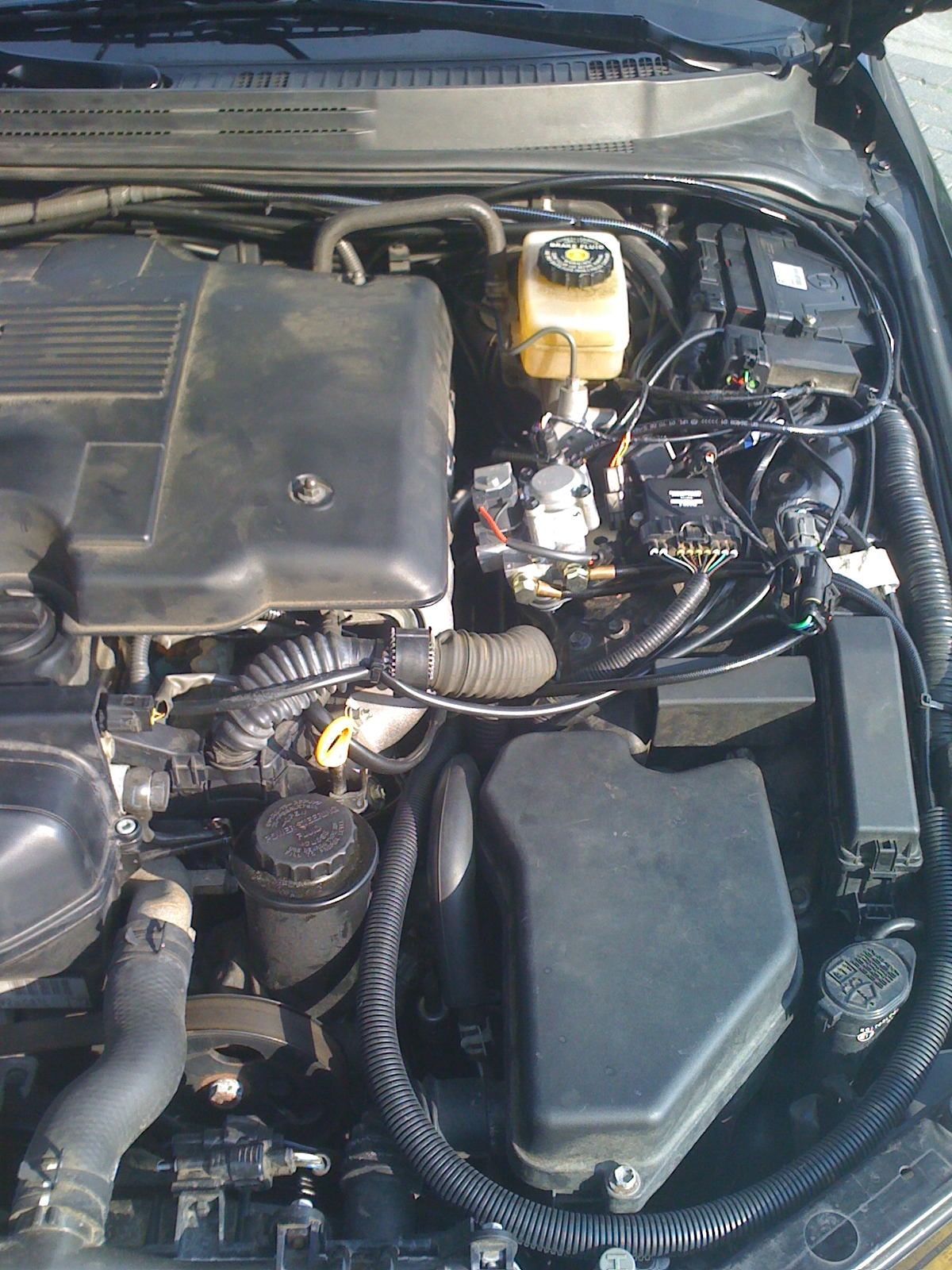
Vialle LPI liquid injection on a 2003 Lexus IS 300 2JZ-GE

The different autogas systems generally use the same type of filler, tanks, lines and fittings but use different components in the engine bay. Liquid injection systems use special tanks with circulation pumps and return lines similar to petrol fuel injection systems.

There are three basic types of autogas system. The oldest of these is the conventional converter-and-mixer system, which has existed since the 1940s and is still widely used today. The other two types are known as injection systems, but there are significant differences between the two.

A converter-mixer system uses a converter to change liquid fuel from the tank into vapour, then feeds that vapour to the mixer where it is mixed with the intake air. This is also known as a venturi system or "single point" system.

Vapour phase injection systems also use a converter, but unlike the mixer system, the gas exits the converter at a regulated pressure. The gas is then injected into the air intake manifold via a series of electrically controlled injectors. The injector opening times are controlled by the autogas control unit. This unit works in much the same way as a petrol fuel injection control unit. This enables electronically controlled fuel metering, which may affect fuel consumption, power and emissions compared with mixer systems.

Liquid phase injection systems do not use a converter, but instead deliver the liquid fuel into a fuel rail in much the same manner as a petrol injection system. These systems are still very much in their infancy. Because the fuel vaporises in the intake, the air around it is cooled significantly. This increases intake-air density and can affect engine power output; systems may be calibrated to remain within engine operating limits. Performance and emissions may differ between liquid-phase injection, mixer and vapour-phase injection systems.

== System components ==
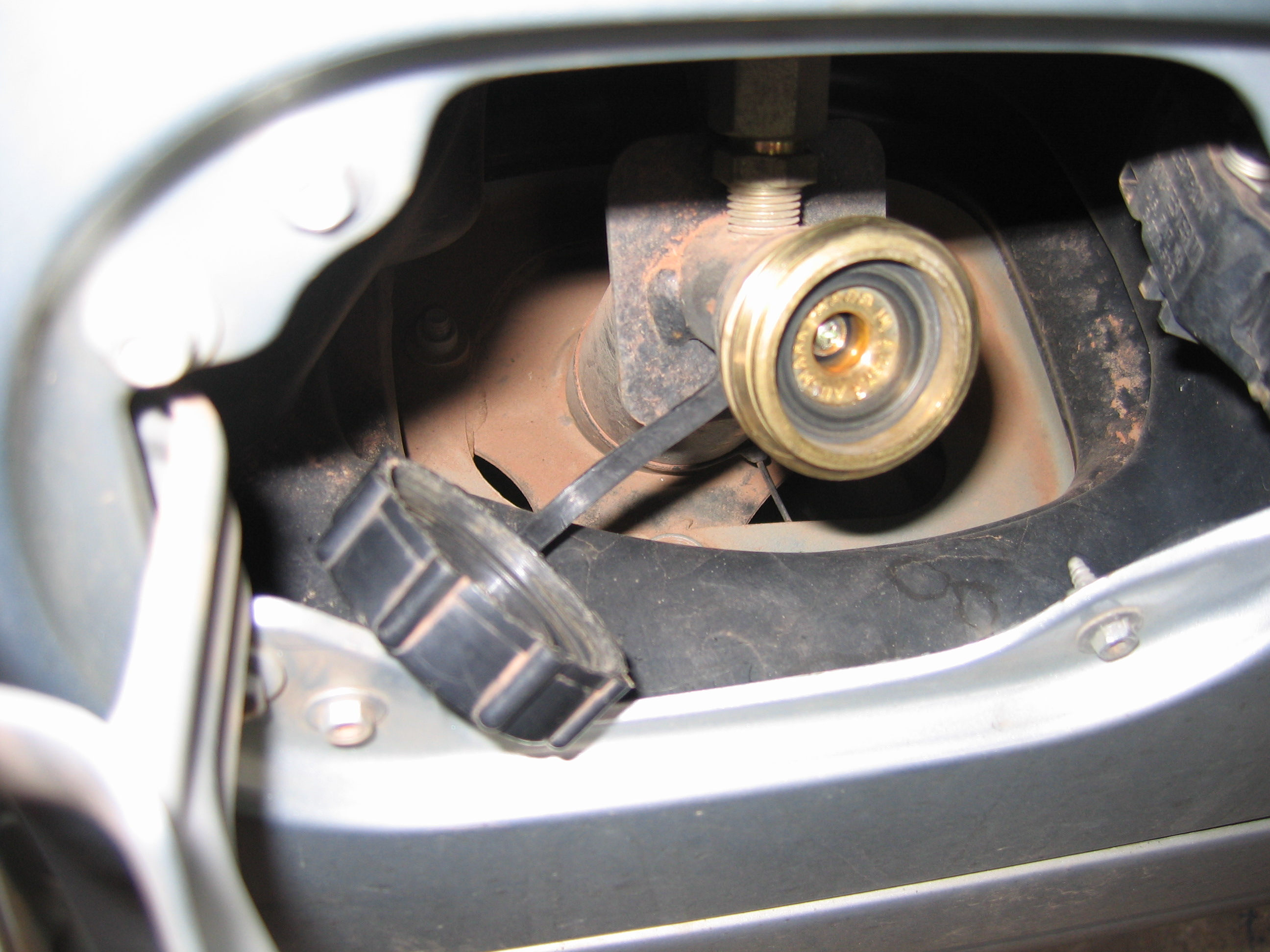
Fuel filler in E-Gas Ford Falcon

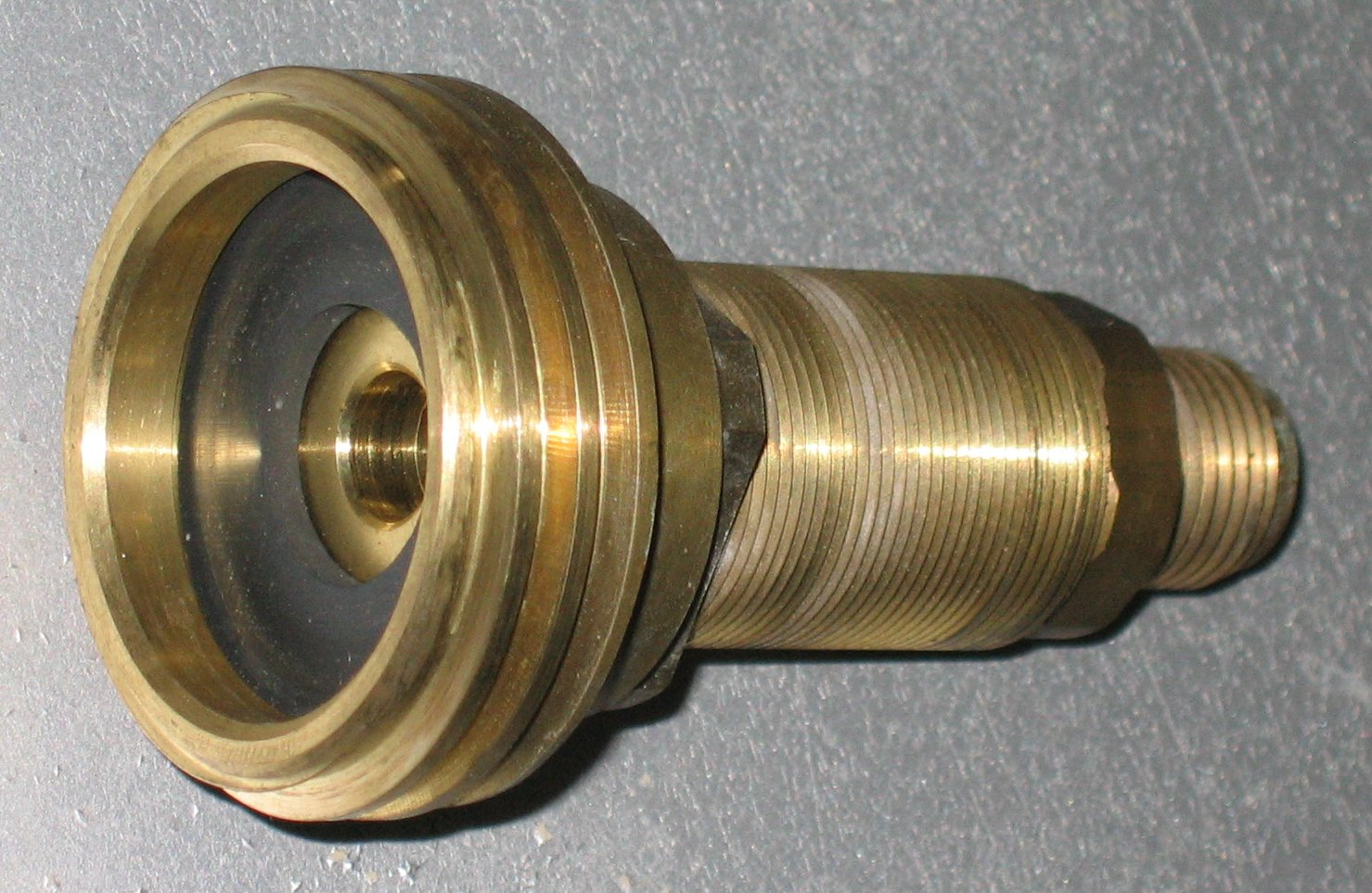
Filler with mounting and cover removed

=== Filler ===
LPG fuelling connectors world map

The fuel is transferred into a vehicle tank as liquid by connecting the bowser at the filling station to the filler fitting on the vehicle.

The type of filler used varies from country to country, and in some cases different types are used within the same country.

Four types are:

1. ACME thread. This type has a threaded fitting onto which the bowser nozzle is screwed before the trigger is pulled to establish a seal before fuel transfer. This type is used in Australia, US, Germany, Belgium, Republic of Ireland. Some LPG filling stations in the United Kingdom also use ACME.
2. 'Dutch' bayonet. This type establishes a gas-proof seal by a push and twist action. This type is used in the United Kingdom, Netherlands and Switzerland. Some LPG filling stations in Norway also use bayonet. Spain was using a longer version of bayonet when LPG was still for taxis only, but has switched to Euronozzle when LPG sales were made available to the general public.
3. 'Italian' dish. This type is used in Italy, France, Portugal, Poland, Czech Republic, Slovakia, Austria, Hungary, Slovenia, Croatia, Serbia, Albania, Greece, Bulgaria, Romania, Ukraine, Russia, Lithuania, Latvia, Estonia and Sweden.
4. Euronozzle. This type of adaptor was developed to minimise or eliminate the small amount of gas that escapes when disconnecting the filler hose from the vehicle. The Euronozzle is (or was) supposed to become a unified new filling system for the entire European continent, but investments in such a change-over have failed to start. As of 2018 Spain remains the only country in Europe that has adopted the Euronozzle adaptor, a decision that was made when Spain had to redevelop a filling station network for LPG from practically zero.

Adaptors that allow a vehicle fitted with a particular system to refuel at a station equipped with another system are available.

The fill valve contains a check valve so that the liquid in the line between the filler and the tank(s) does not escape when the bowser nozzle is disconnected.

In installations where more than one tank is fitted, T-fittings may be used to connect the tanks to one filler so that the tanks are filled simultaneously. In some applications, more than one filler may be fitted, such as on opposite sides of the vehicle. These may be connected to separate tanks, or may be connected to the same tanks using T-fittings in the same manner as for connecting multiple tanks to one filler.

Fillers are typically made of brass to avoid the possibility of sparks when attaching or removing the bowser that might occur if steel fittings were used.

=== Hoses, pipes and fittings ===
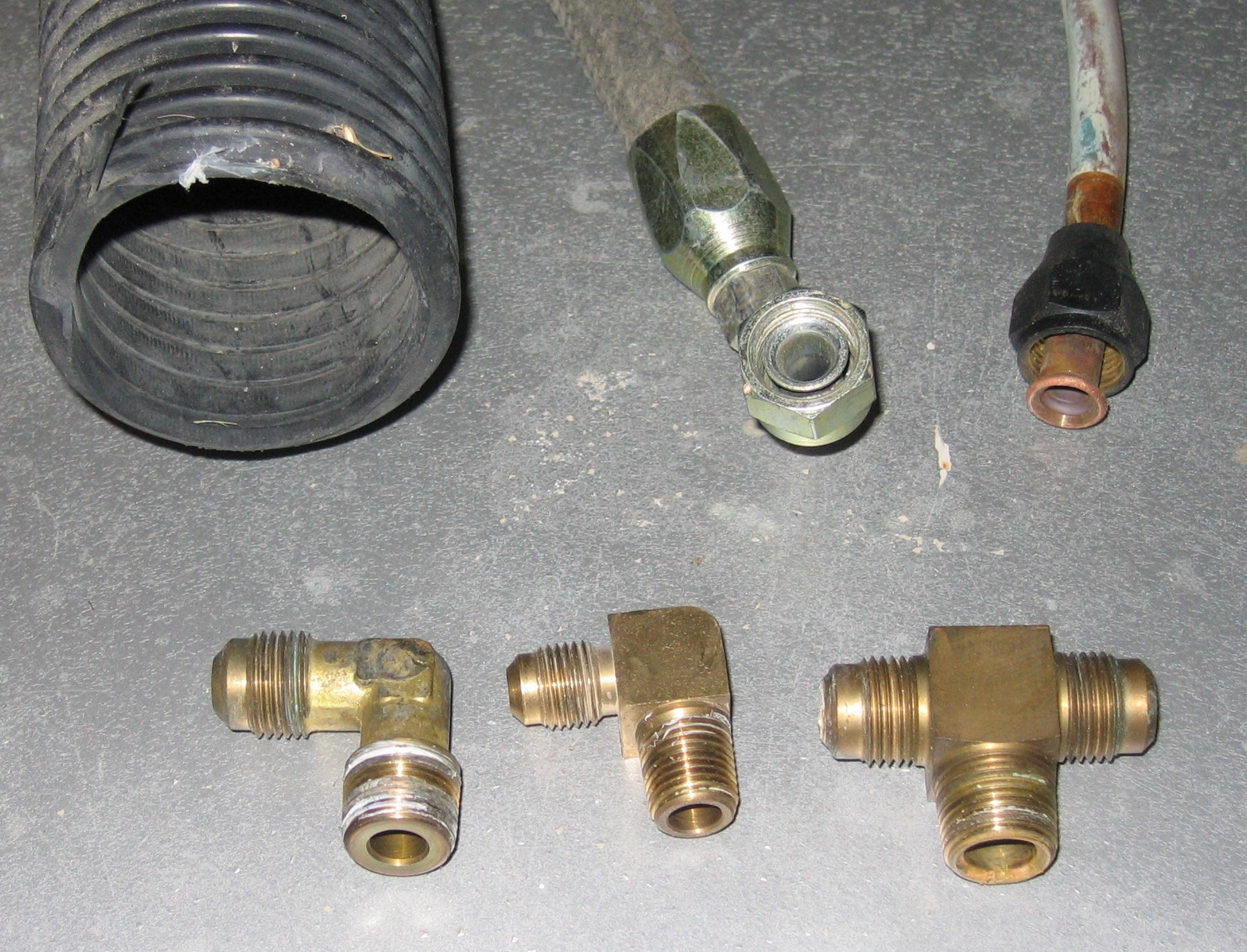
Gas lines and fittings. Containment hose, liquid hose, copper pipe with flared end plus brass elbows and T fitting.

The hose between the filler and tank(s) is called the fill hose or fill line. The hose or pipe between the tank(s) and the converter is called the service line. These both carry liquid under pressure.

The flexible hose between the converter and mixer is called the vapour hose or vapour line. This line carries vapour at low pressure and has a much larger diameter to suit.

Where the tank valves are located inside an enclosed space such as the boot of a sedan, a plastic containment hose is used to provide a gas-tight seal between the gas components and the inside of the vehicle.

Liquid hoses for LPG are specifically designed and rated for the pressures that exist in LPG systems, and are made from materials designed to be compatible with the fuel. Some hoses are made with crimped fittings, while others are made using re-usable fittings that are pressed or screwed onto the end of the hose.

Rigid sections of liquid line are usually made using copper tubing, although in some applications, steel pipes are used instead. The ends of the pipes are always double-flared and fitted with flare nuts to secure them to the fittings.

Liquid line fittings are mostly made from brass. The fittings typically adapt from a thread in a component, such as a BSP or NPT threaded hole on a tank, to an SAE flare fitting to suit the ends of pipes or hoses.

=== Tank ===
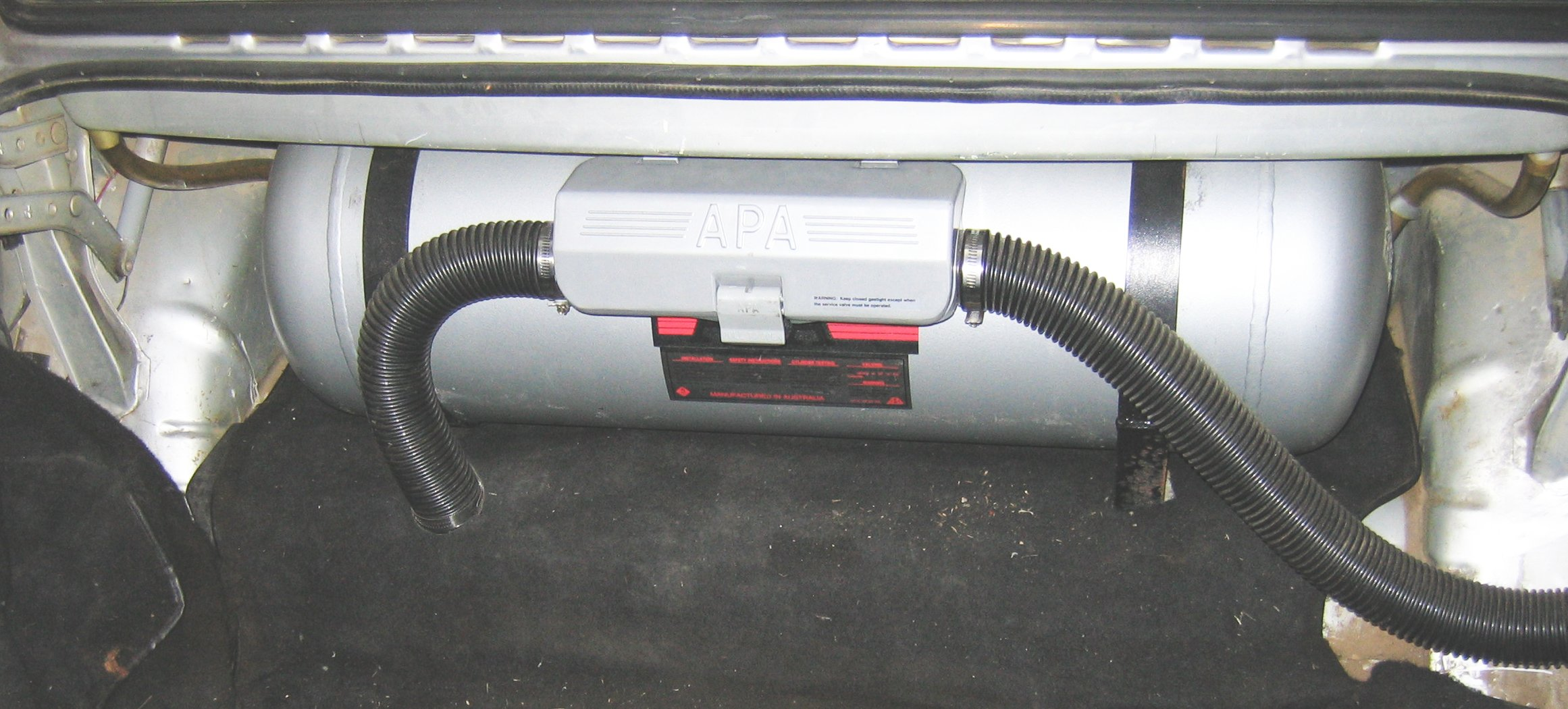
Autogas tank in boot of Volvo sedan

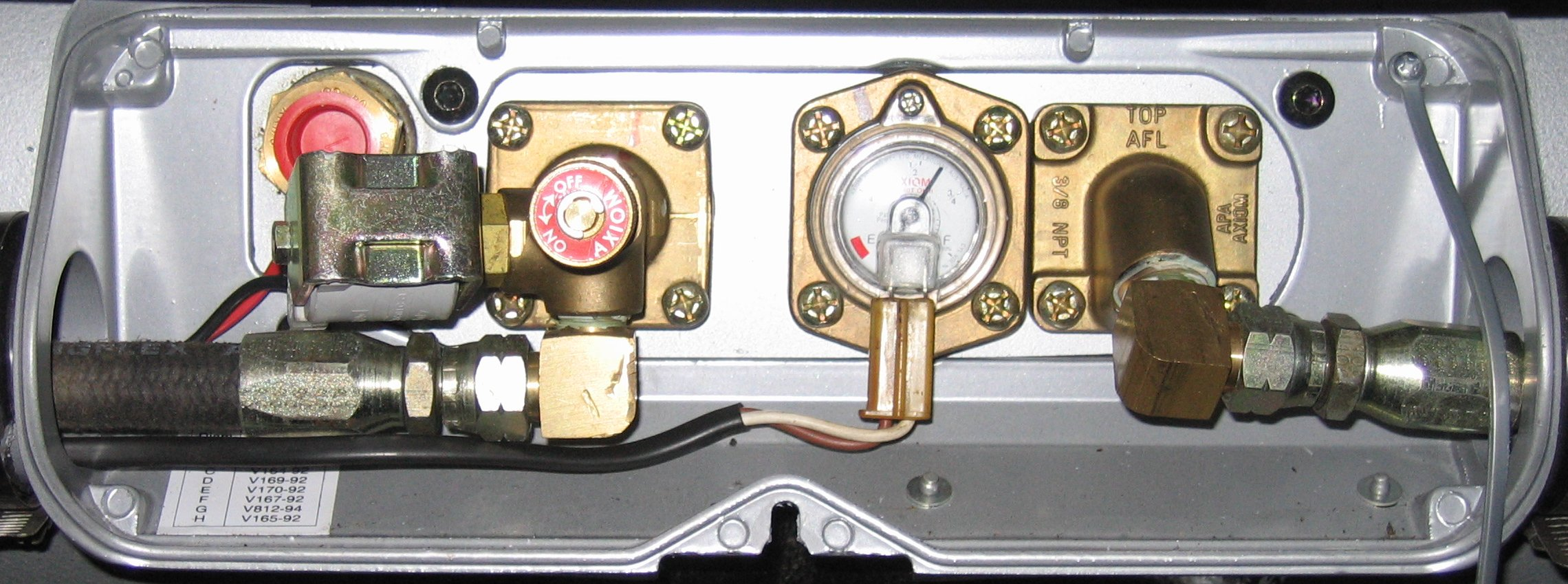
Tank valves. From left, relief valve (with red cap), service valve, gauge and fill valve.

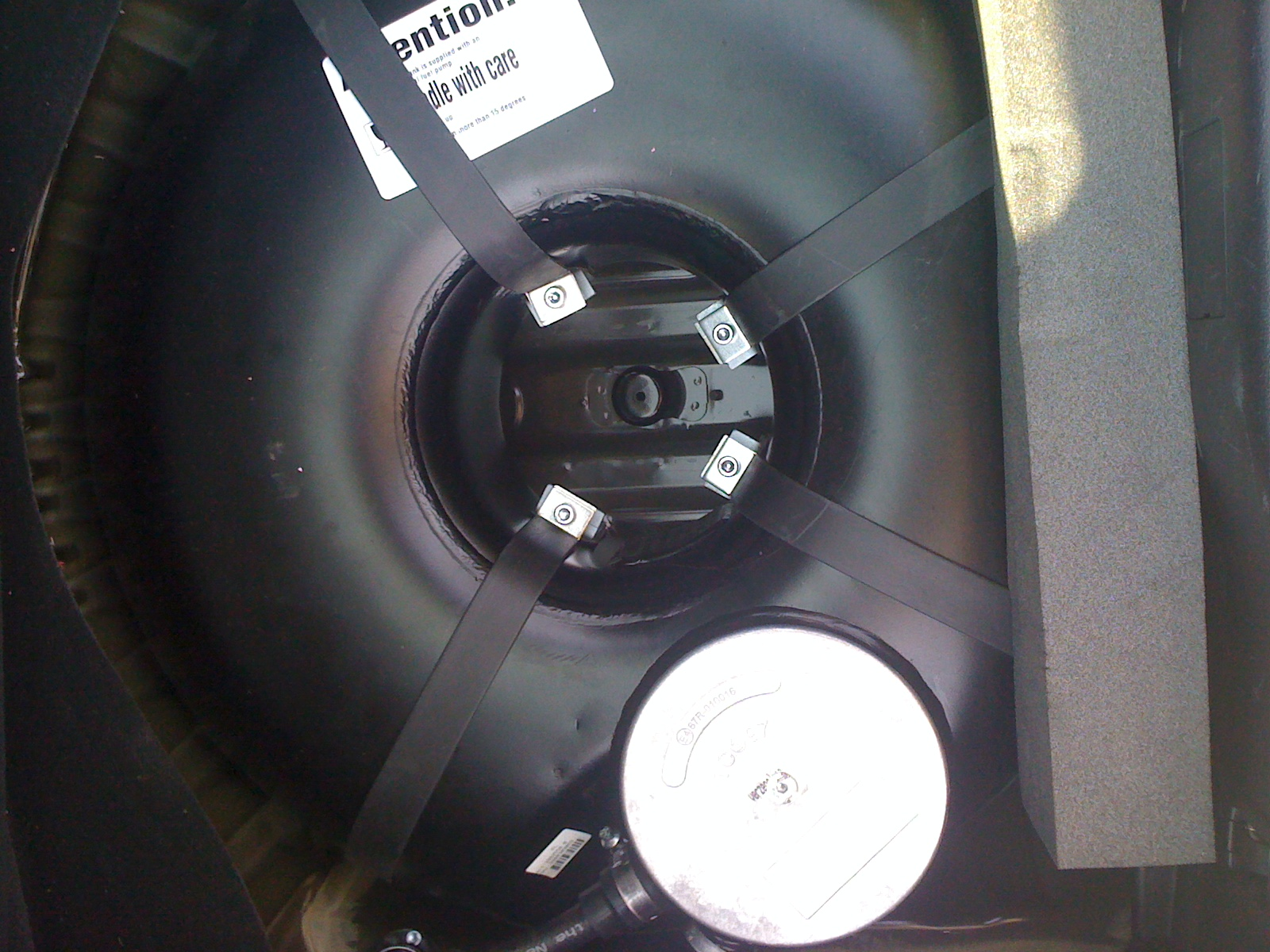
Autogas tank inside spare wheel recess

Vehicles are often fitted with only one tank, but multiple tanks are used in some applications. In passenger car applications, the tank is typically either a cylindrical tank, made from steel, mounted in the boot of the vehicle or a toroidal tank (also steel) or set of permanently interconnected cylinders placed in the spare wheel well. In commercial vehicle applications, the tanks are generally cylindrical tanks mounted either in the cargo space or on the chassis underneath the body. Increasingly, the tank is an aluminium Conformable Tank, which is lighter, has more capacity and cannot rust.

The tanks have fittings for filling, liquid outlet, emergency relief of excess pressure, fuel level gauge and sometimes a vapour outlet. These may be separate valves mounted into a series of 3 to 5 holes in a plate welded into the tank shell, or may be assembled onto a multi-valve unit which is bolted into one large hole on a boss welded, or in the case of an aluminium tank, extruded as part of the tank shell.

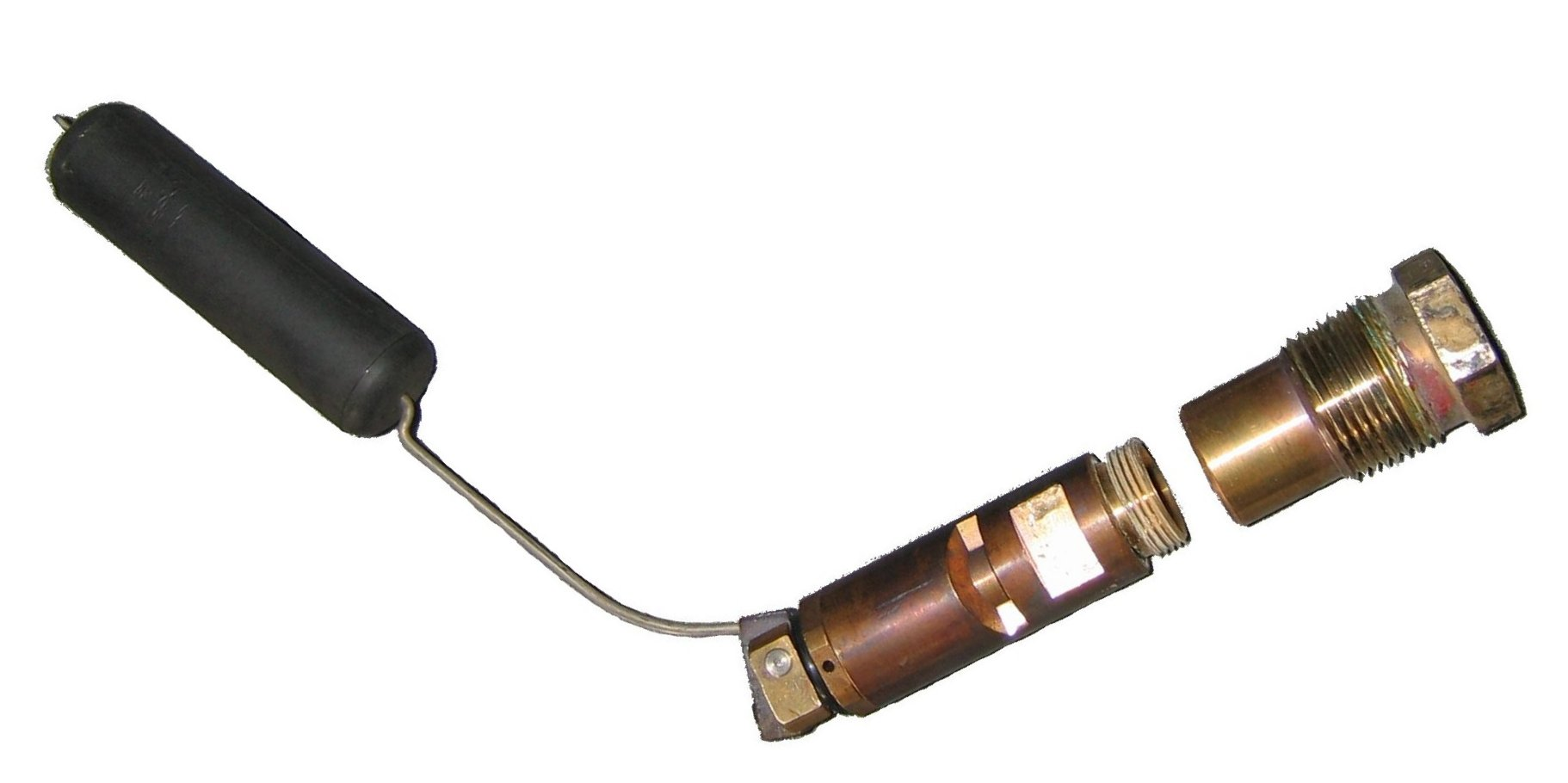
Fill valve and AFL

Modern fill valves are usually fitted with an automatic fill limiter (AFL) to prevent overfilling. The AFL has a float arm which restricts the flow significantly but does not shut it off entirely. This is intended to cause the pressure in the line to rise enough to tell the bowser to stop pumping but not cause dangerously high pressures. Before AFLs were introduced, it was common for the filler (with integral check valve) to be screwed directly into the tank, as the operator had to open an ullage valve at the tank while filling, allowing vapour out of the top of the tank and stopping filling when liquid started coming out of the ullage valve to indicate that the tank was full. Modern tanks are not fitted with ullage valves.

The liquid outlet is usually used to supply fuel to the engine, and is usually referred to as the service valve. Modern service valves incorporate an electric shut-off solenoid. In applications using very small engines such as small generators, vapour may be withdrawn from the top of the tank instead of liquid from the bottom of the tank.

The emergency pressure relief valve in the tank is called a hydrostatic pressure relief valve. It is designed to open if the pressure in the tank is dangerously high, thus releasing some vapour to the atmosphere to reduce the pressure in the tank. The release of a small quantity of vapour reduces the pressure in the tank, which causes some of the liquid in the tank to vaporise to re-establish equilibrium between liquid and vapour. The latent heat of vaporisation causes the tank to cool, which reduces pressure even further.

The gauge sender is usually a magnetically coupled arrangement, with a float arm inside the tank rotating a magnet, which rotates an external gauge. The external gauge is usually readable directly, and most also incorporate an electronic sender to operate a fuel gauge on the dashboard.

=== Valves ===
There are a number of types of valve used in autogas systems. The most common ones are shut-off or filter-lock valves, which are used to stop flow in the service line. These may be operated by vacuum or electricity. On bi-fuel systems with a petrol carburettor, a similar shut-off valve is usually fitted in the petrol line between the pump and carburettor.

Check valves are fitted in the filler and on the fill input to the fuel tank to prevent fuel flowing back the wrong way.

Service valves are fitted to the outlet from the tank to the service line. These have a tap to turn the fuel on and off. The tap is usually only closed when the tank is being worked on. In some countries, an electrical shut-off valve is built into the service valve.

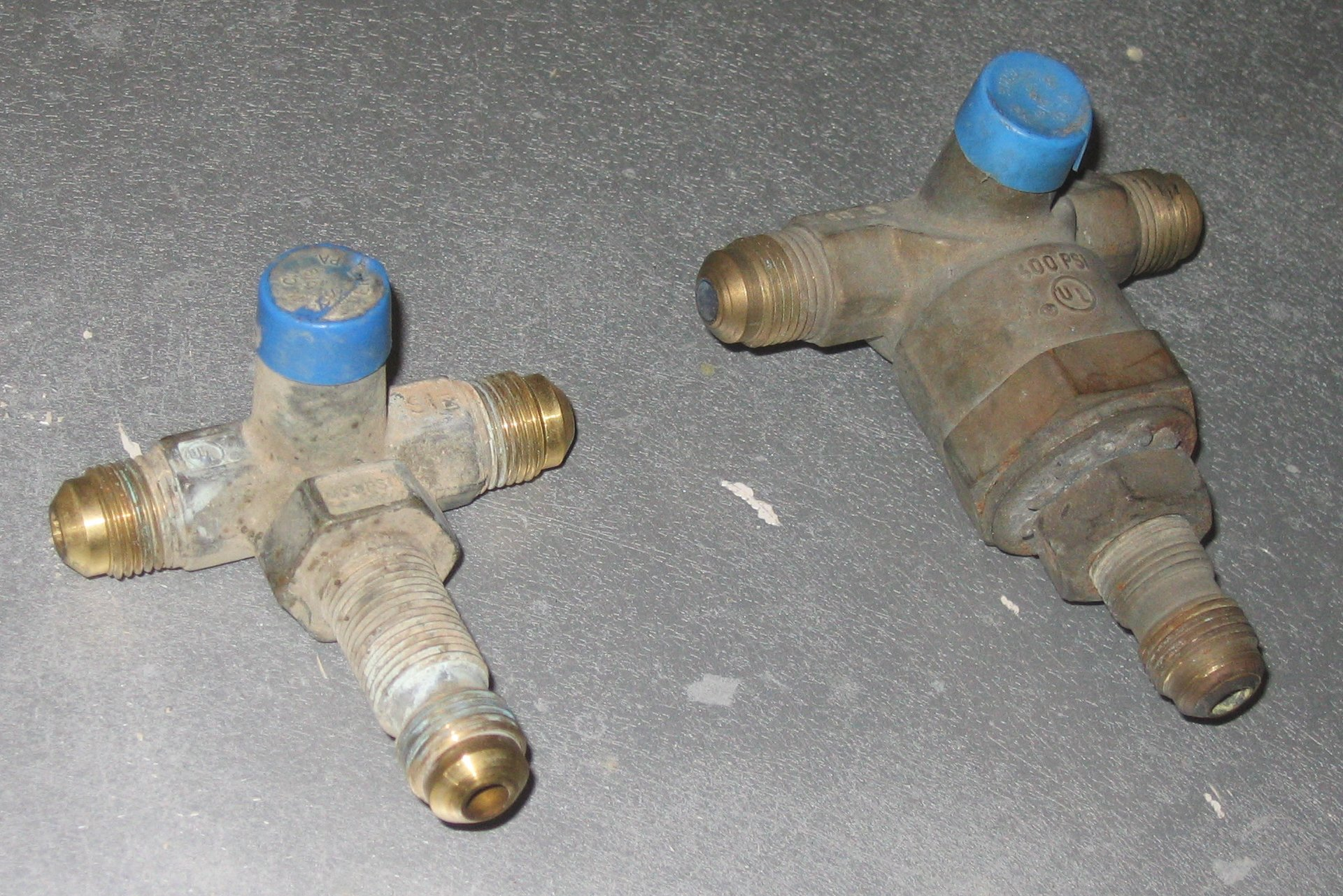
Two Sherwood valves. 1995 on left, 1989 on right.

Where multiple tanks are fitted, a combination of check valves and a hydrostatic relief valve are usually installed to prevent fuel from flowing from one tank to another. In Australia, there is a common assembly designed for this purpose. It is a combined twin check valve and hydrostatic relief valve assembly built in the form of a T-fitting, such that the lines from the tanks come into the sides of the valve and the outlet to the converter comes out the end. Because there is only one common brand of these valves, they are known colloquially as a Sherwood valve.

=== Converter ===
The converter (also known as vaporiser or reducer) is a device designed to change the fuel from a pressurised liquid to a vapour at around atmospheric pressure for delivery to the mixer or vapour phase injectors. Because of the refrigerant characteristic of the fuel, heat must be put into the fuel by the converter. This is usually achieved by having engine coolant circulated through a heat exchanger that transfers heat from that coolant to the LPG.

There are two distinctly different basic types of converter for use with mixer type systems. The European style of converter is a more complex device that incorporates an idle circuit and is designed to be used with a simple fixed venturi mixer. The American style of converter is a simpler design which is intended to be used with a variable venturi mixer that incorporates an idle circuit.

Engines with a low power output such as; scooters, quad bikes and generators can use a simpler type of converter (also known as governor or regulator). These converters are fed with fuel in vapour form. Evaporation takes place in the tank where refrigeration occurs as the liquid fuel boils. The tanks large surface area exposed to the ambient air temperature combined with the low power output (fuel requirement) of the engine make this type of system viable. The refrigeration of the fuel tank is proportional to fuel demand hence this arrangement is only used on smaller engines. This type of converter can either be fed with vapour at tank pressure (called a 2-stage regulator) or be fed via a tank mounted regulator at a fixed reduced pressure (called a single stage regulator).

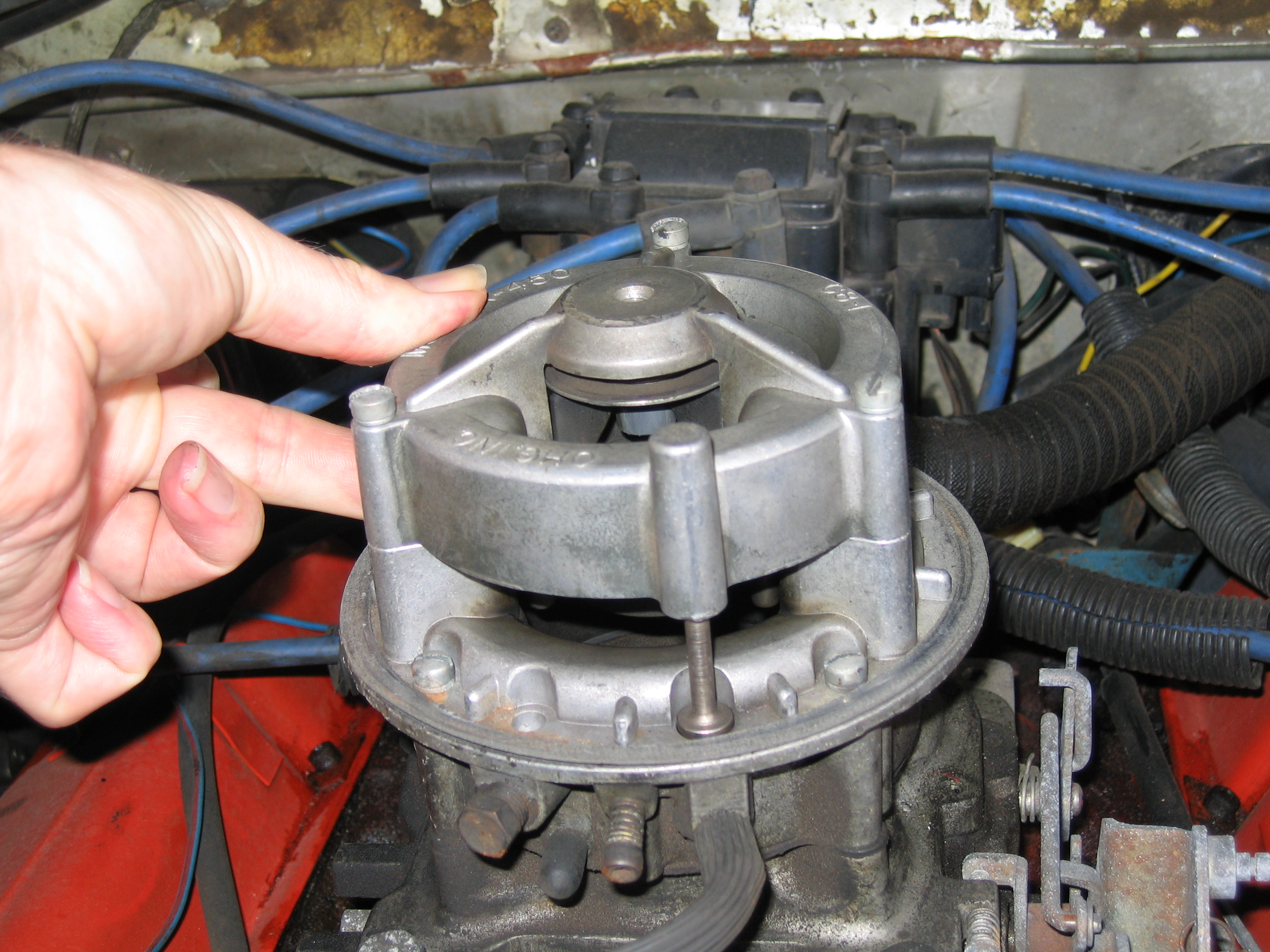
OHG X-450 mixer showing air valve open to full load position

=== Mixer ===
The mixer is the device that mixes the fuel into the air flowing to the engine. The mixer incorporates a venturi designed to draw the fuel into the airflow due to the movement of the air.

Mixer type systems have existed since the 1940s and some designs have changed little over that time. Mixers are now being increasingly superseded by injectors.

=== Vapour phase injectors ===
Most vapour phase injection systems mount the solenoids in a manifold block or injector rail, then run hoses to the nozzles, which are screwed into holes drilled and tapped into the runners of the intake manifold. There is usually one nozzle for each cylinder. Some vapour injection systems resemble petrol injection, having separate injectors that fit into the manifold or head in the same manner as petrol injectors, and are fed fuel through a fuel rail.

=== Liquid phase injectors ===
Liquid phase injectors are mounted onto the engine in a manner similar to petrol injectors, being mounted directly at the inlet manifold and fed liquid fuel from a fuel rail.

=== Electrical and electronic controls ===
There are four distinct electrical systems that may be used in autogas systems – fuel gauge sender, fuel shut-off, closed loop feedback mixture control and injection control.

In some installations, the fuel gauge sender fitted to the autogas tank is matched to the original fuel gauge in the vehicle. In others, an additional gauge is added to display the level of fuel in the autogas tank separately from the existing petrol gauge.

In most modern installations, an electronic device called a tachometric relay or safety switch is used to operate electrical shut-off solenoids. These work by sensing that the engine is running by detecting ignition pulses. Some systems use an engine oil pressure sensor instead. In all installations, there is a filterlock (consisting of a filter assembly and a vacuum or electric solenoid operated shut-off valve) located at the input to the converter. In European converters, there is also a solenoid in the converter to shut off the idle circuit. These valves are usually both connected to the output of the tachometric relay or oil pressure switch. Where solenoids are fitted to the outputs of fuel tanks, these are also connected to the output of the tachometric relay or oil pressure switch. In installations with multiple tanks, a switch or changeover relay may be fitted to allow the driver to select which tank to use fuel from. On bi-fuel, the switch used to change between fuels is used to turn off the tachometric relay.

Closed loop feedback systems use an electronic controller that operates in much the same way as in a petrol fuel injection systems, using an oxygen sensor to effectively measure the air/fuel mixture by measuring the oxygen content of the exhaust and control valve on the converter or in the vapour line to adjust the mixture. Mixer type systems that do not have a closed loop feedback fitted are sometimes referred to as open loop systems.

Injection systems use a computerised control system which is very similar to that used in petrol injection systems. In virtually all systems, the injection control system integrates the tachometric relay and closed loop feedback functions.

=== Optional valve protection ===
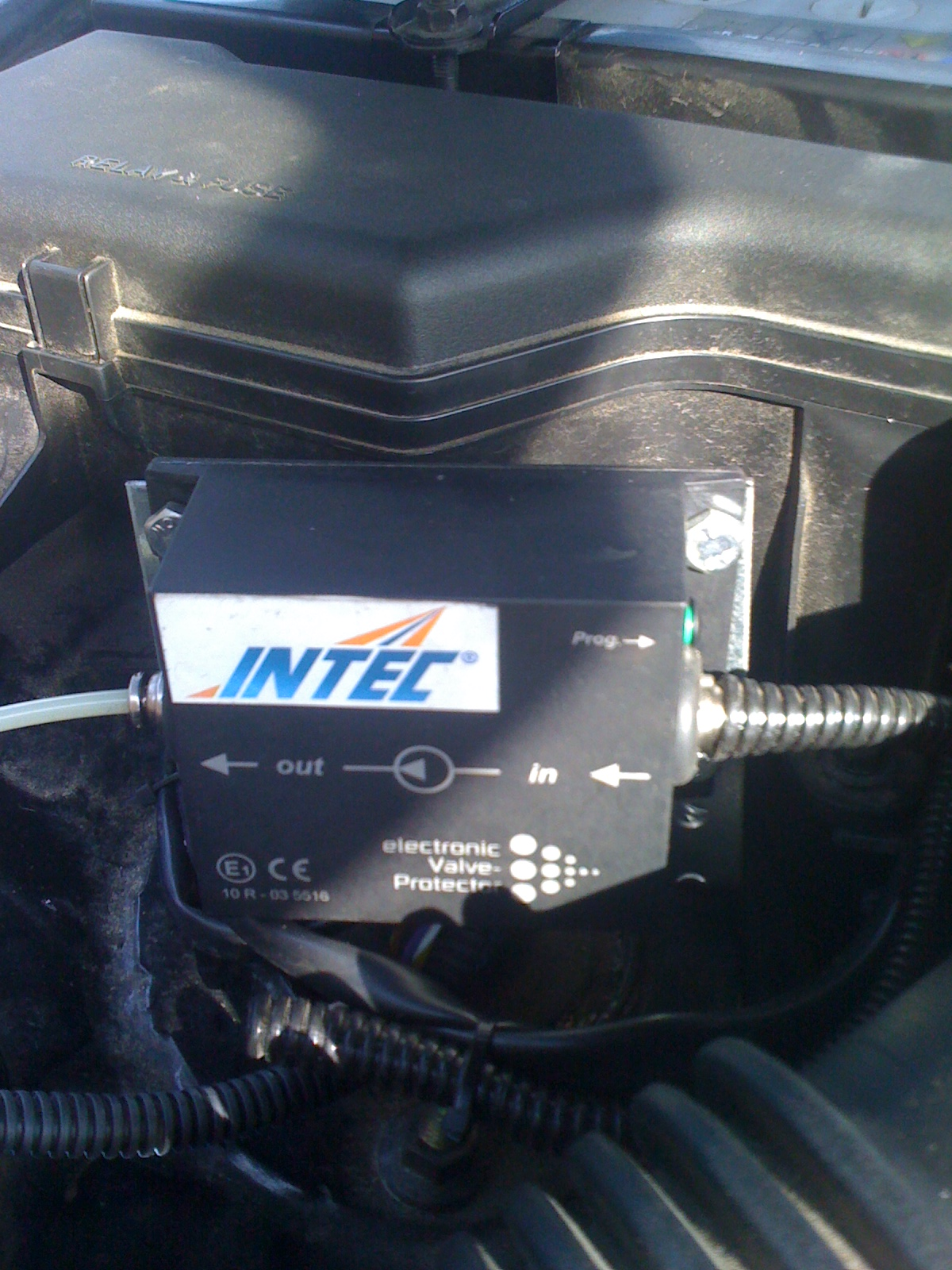
INTEC electronic valve protection system

Some LPG equipment installers recommend additional valve-protection systems. These can consist in the most simple case of a bottle containing valve protection liquid. The liquid is drawn into the air intake system and distributed into the engines' cylinders along with the fuel and air.

Other systems can consist of a piggyback ECU that is synchronised with the LPG injector ECU. This results in a more precise injection of valve protection fluid.

== Converter-and-mixer system operation ==
The designs of converters and mixers are matched to each other by matching sizes and shapes of components within the two.

In most areas of the world the word "converter" is not commonly used. 'Regulator' or 'reducer' or 'vaporiser' are more popular.

Because it has 3 main functions:

1. Reducer: reduces the high pressure of incoming liquid phase LPG down to atmospheric pressure.
2. Regulator: regulates the gas flow according to the requirement of the engine.
3. Vaporiser: vaporises the liquid form LPG into gas form by using the hot coolant circulation of the engine.

In European style systems, the size and shape of the venturi of the carburettor is designed to match the converter. In USA style systems, the air valve and metering pins in the mixer are sized to match the diaphragm size and spring stiffness in the converter. In both cases, the components are matched by the manufacturers and only basic adjustments are needed during installation and tuning.

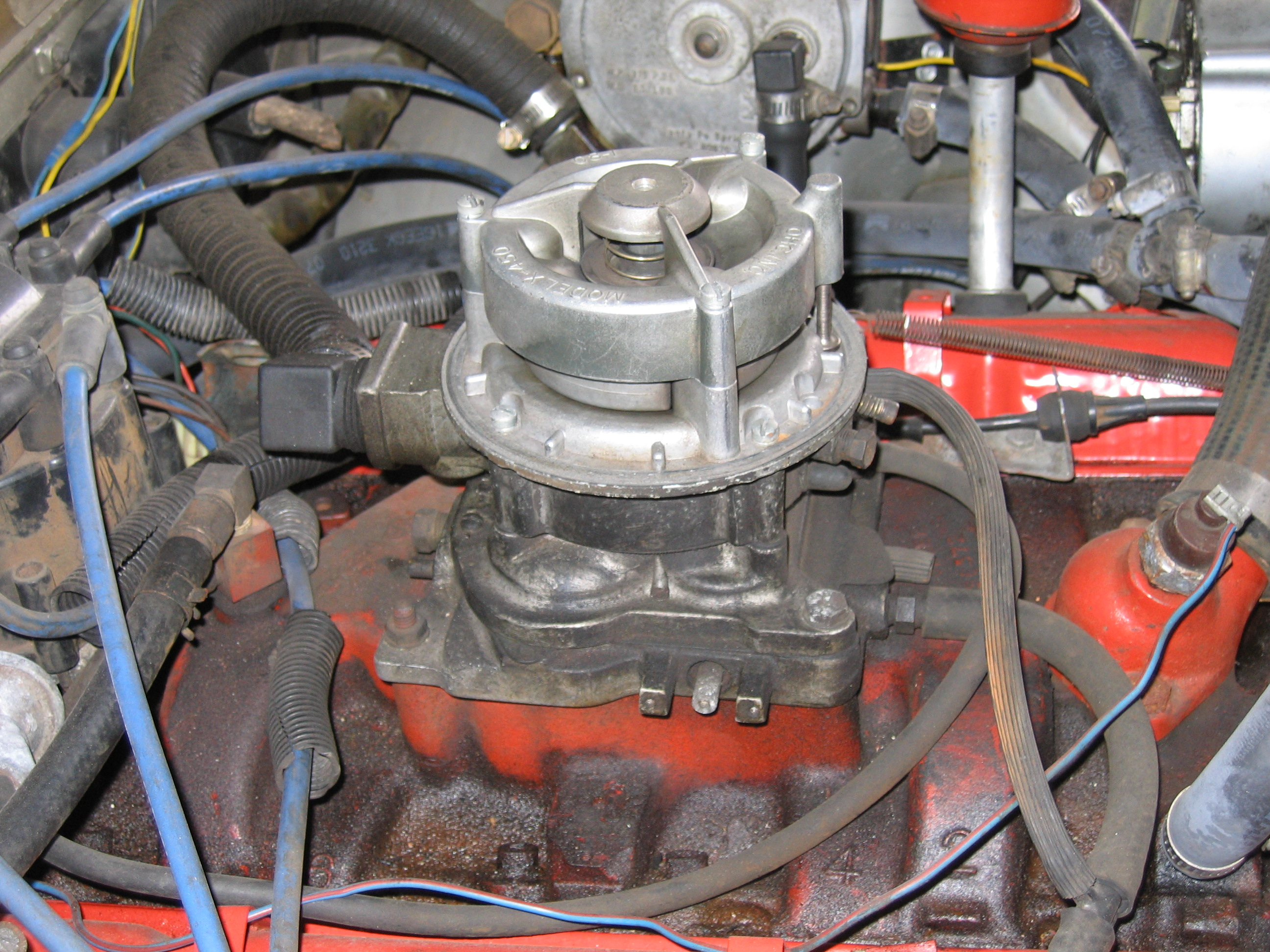
Autogas carburettor consisting of OHG X-450 mixer, adapter and Rochester throttlebody

An autogas carburettor may simply consist of a throttlebody and a mixer, sometimes fitted together using an adapter, the venturi is not needed.

Cold start enrichment is achieved by the fact that the engine coolant is cold when the engine is cold. This causes denser vapour to be delivered to the mixer. As the engine warms up, the coolant temperature rises until the engine is at operating temperature and the mixture has leaned off to the normal running mixture. Depending on the system, the throttle may need to be held open further when the engine is cold in the same manner as with a petrol carburettor. On others, the normal mixture is intended to be somewhat lean and no cold-start throttle increase is needed. Because of the way enrichment is achieved, no additional choke butterfly is required for cold starting with LPG. Some evaporators have an electric choke valve, energising this valve, before starting the engine, will spray some LPG vapour into the carburettor to help cold start.

The temperature of the engine is critical to the tuning of an autogas system. The engine thermostat effectively controls the temperature of the converter, thus directly affecting the mixture. A faulty thermostat, or a thermostat of the wrong temperature range for the design of the system may not operate correctly.

The power output capacity of a system is limited by the ability of the converter to deliver a stable flow of vapour. A coolant temperature lower than intended will reduce the maximum power output possible, as will an air bubble trapped in the cooling circuit or complete loss of coolant. All converters have a limit, beyond which mixtures become unstable. Unstable mixtures typically contain tiny droplets of liquid fuel that were not heated enough in the converter and will vaporise in the mixer or intake to form an excessively rich mixture. When this occurs, the mixture will become so rich that the engine will flood and stall. Because the outside of the converter will be at or below 0 °C when this happens, water vapour from the air will freeze onto the outside of the converter, forming an icy white layer. Some converters are very susceptible to cracking when this happens.

== LPG injection for diesel vehicles ==
LPG may be used for a supplemental fuel for diesels of all sizes. Diesel contains 128,700 BTU per US gallon, where propane contains 91,690 BTU per US gallon. If LPG is 30–40% less expensive, there may very well be a saving. Any actual savings are dependent on the relative cost of diesel versus LPG. In Australia, a supplier claimed savings of 10–20%, depending on fuel prices.

The above systems add small quantities of LPG with the primary aim of improving economy, but much larger quantities of LPG can be injected in order to increase power. Even at full output a diesel engine runs about 50% lean of stoichiometric to avoid black smoke production, so there is a substantial amount of oxygen in the intake charge which is not consumed in the combustion process. This oxygen is therefore available for the combustion of a substantial addition of LPG resulting in a large increase in power output.

== See also ==
- Gas engine
- Hybrid vehicle
