= Vialle =

Netherlands-based alternative fuels technology company

Vialle Autogas Systems B.V. is a Netherlands-based alternative fuels technology company specializing in autogas equipment.

Vialle started as an importer of liquefied petroleum gas (LPG) equipment in 1967.

Vialle was the first company to invent and patent liquid propane injection in the 1980s. The solution was patented and released to the market in 1993 as the "LPI" product.

== Liquid propane injection (LPI) for MPI engines ==
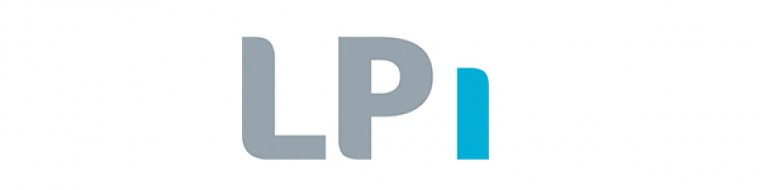
Vialle LPi logo

This allows the controlled liquid injection of autogas, resulting in better performance and better combustion. LPI-LPG systems can be applied to the modern direct injection, lean burn and turbocharged engines, while keeping all the original characteristics of the engine completely preserved. Because the LPI-LPG system uses the original petrol computer, all the original features are retained while being less harmful to the environment.

The Vialle LPI liquid injection system delivers propane autogas to the cylinder in a liquid form, capturing the phase change from liquid to gas in an intercooler effect. The resultant increase in air mass and decrease in temperature benefits the combustion cycle with higher output efficiencies when compared to older vapor-based technologies.

Vialle LPI liquid injection systems are certified for operation at −40 °C and operate without a reducer or vaporizer. This enables use of the systems without "warming up" the engine as in vapor-based systems.

== Liquid Propane Direct Injection (LPDI) ==
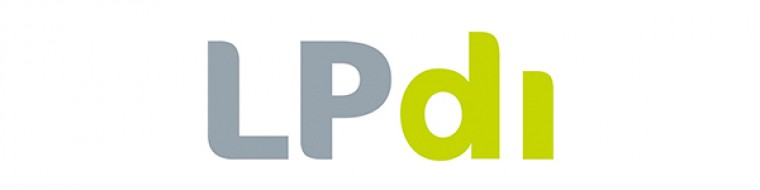
Vialle-LPdi logo

LPDI was developed and released to the market in 2006. The Vialle LPDI system is designed for modern direct injection engines like the Ford EcoBoost, Volkswagen FSI, TSI and Hyundai GDI engines. The LPDI system utilizes the OEM high-pressure fuel pump and injectors to deliver either gasoline or autogas to the engine. The solution works on lean-burn, turbo boosted and standard direct injection engines. Direct Injection engines will become more prevalent in the market due to tighter emissions standards for greenhouse gases and particulates and the desire for further fuel savings.
