= Propane Education and Research Council =

Propane Education & Research Council
- Formation: February 1998; 28 years ago
- Type: 501(C)6
- Tax ID no.: 36-4192410
- Location: Washington D.C.
- Coordinates: 38.905°N 77.04114°W
- Revenue: $27,154,734 (2015)
- Website: propane.com

The Propane Education and Research Council (PERC) is a nonprofit that provides propane safety and training programs and invests in research and development of new propane-powered technologies. PERC is operated and funded by the propane industry. PERC programs benefit a variety of markets including transportation, agriculture, commercial landscaping, residential, and commercial building.

PERC was authorized by the U.S. Congress with the passage of the Propane Education and Research Act (PERA), signed into law on Oct. 11, 1996. PERC is governed by a 21-member board appointed by the National Propane Gas Association and the Gas Processors Association. Each association appoints nine Council members and they cooperate in the appointment of three public members.

PERC's operations and activities are funded by an assessment levied on each gallon of propane gas at the point it is odorized or imported into the United States.

There has been controversy about the provocative anti-electrification messaging using influencers, despite the money collected by fees on propane sales being supposed to be used for research and safety. In 2023, the organization planned to spend $13 million on its anti-electrification campaign, including $600,000 on “influencers”.
