= National Propane Gas Association =

- Formation: 1931; 95 years ago (as National Bottled Gas Association); Lisle, Illinois, U.S.
- Founders: H. Emerson Thomas; George Oberfell; Mark Anton
- Headquarters: Washington, D.C., U.S.
- President: Stephen Kaminski
- Chairman: Michelle Bimson-Maggi
- Chair-Elect: Jeff Stewart
- Website: npga.org

The National Propane Gas Association (NPGA) is an American trade association composed of various companies and other entities in the propane, butane, and liquefied petroleum gas industries.

== History ==
The NPGA was established in 1931 as the National Bottled Gas Association (NBGA); in 1937, the name changed to the Liquified Petroleum Gas Association (LPGA) to encompass the entire LPG industry. In 1942, the LPGA opened an office in Washington, D.C. to lobby U.S. Congress and promote the use of LPG as essential to the American effort in World War II. After the war, state associations emerged, conventions and trade shows resumed, and LPGA moved its main office from New York City to Chicago. In 1959, the organization became the National Liquified Petroleum Gas Association (NLPGA) and in 1987, it assumed its current name of the National Propane Gas Association (NPGA). The Chicago office closed in 2007, consolidating the NPGA office in Washington, D.C..

== Governance and structure ==
The NPGA is governed by a board of directors with a chairman, chairman-elect, vice chairman, treasurer and secretary. Six standing committees oversee a wide range of topics concerning the industry and the association: Audit; Conventions; Governmental Affairs; Member Services; Propane Supply & Logistics; and Technology, Standards & Safety. Committee members formulate policies and programs which advance the interests of the industry in those areas.

The NPGA has more than 2,300 member companies in all 50 states and 12 countries; 36 state and/or regional associations; and three business councils and membership interest groups: Women in Propane Council, Benchmarking Council, and Cylinder Exchange Council.

== Policy ==
The NPGA describes the focus of their advocacy work as "preventing unnecessary legislative and regulatory restrictions on the use of propane". They do this both directly and through their political action committee PropanePAC. For example, in 2025, NPGA CEO Stephen Kaminsky met with President Donald Trump to remove previous restrictions on NOx emissions and autogas vehicles.

The NPGA offers a variety of programs to benefit its members and the propane industry. Workforce development programs include:

- The Administrative Compliance Experts (ACE) program, for entry-level drivers working to obtain a commercial driver's license and/or hazardous materials endorsement.
- An apprenticeship program in partnership with the Propane Education & Research Council (PERC).
- A scholarship program for the children of NPGA member company employees. NPGF typically awards more than 100 scholarships per year, with several earmarked for students pursuing careers in the propane industry.

The NPGA also runs an annual trade show, the Southeastern Convention & International Propane Expo, and "Propane Days", an annual legislative conference discussing and promoting LPG.
