= Hugo Güldner =

German engineer and inventor (1866–1926)

Personal details
- Born: 18 July 1866 Herdecke, Kingdom of Prussia
- Died: 12 March 1926 (aged 59) Frankfurt am Main, Weimar Republic
- Spouse: Adele Benecke
- Children: 4
- Parent(s): Gustav Güldner, Ida Erdmann
- Education: Höhere Maschinenbauschule Hagen in Westfalen
- Scientific career
- Known for: Inventing the two-stroke diesel engine; Inventing valve overlap
- Fields: Mechanical engineering

Carl Hugo Güldner (18 July 1866 – 12 March 1926) was a German engineer and inventor. He is best known for inventing the two-stroke diesel engine, and the valve overlap in internal combustion engines.

== Life and career ==
Güldner was born in Herdecke, south of Dortmund. He attended the Höhere Maschinenbauschule (mechanical engineering college) in Hagen, and worked as an engineer in Magdeburg throughout the 1890s. In 1891, Güldner married Adele Benecke, with whom he had two sons and two daughters. In Magdeburg, Güldner invented several devices related to internal combustion engines, and he also worked as an editor for the "Der Monteur" magazine. In 1894, Güldner contracted with the Schumann & Küchler factory in Erfurt; however, they never built any engines or devices based upon Güldner's patents. In 1895, Güldner contracted with H. Laas & Co. in Magdeburg, but they also never built any devices. In early 1897, Güldner founded his own company "Güldner and Lüdeke Maschinenfabrik Magdeburg" together with businessperson Lüdeke from Berlin. The same year, the company filed for bankruptcy. In 1898, Güldner worked as senior engineer in Gebr. Pfeiffer's factory in Kaiserslautern – however, Gebr. Pfeiffer were forced to stop production due to patent litigation. Therefore, Güldner quit and started working as the head designer for Diesel's Allgemeine Gesellschaft für Dieselmotoren in Augsburg from 1899. Güldner designed the first two-stroke diesel engine at the Allgemeine Gesellschaft, but it proved to be inferior to the Lauster-designed four-stroke diesel engine. Thus, Güldner decided to quit on 31 October 1899. From late 1899 until 1903, Güldner worked as an author and editor of scientific literature. During that time, Güldner wrote his work "Das Entwerfen und Berechnen von Verbrennungsmotoren", which Friedrich Sass considers the best textbook on internal combustion engines of its time.

On 1 April 1903, Güldner joined Maschinenbau-Gesellschaft München, where he worked as a senior engineer. At Maschinenbau-Gesellschaft München, Güldner designed a four-stroke gas engine with spark ignition. The appearance of this engine resembles contemporary diesel engines. Like the Motor 250/400, Güldner's engine displaces 19,635 cm^{3} and has an indicated power of 20 PS_{i}. It was highly successful, and the first internal combustion engine to use intake and exhaust valve overlap. This, in combination with a scavenging blower, allowed the engine to sufficiently remove all exhaust gases from the combustion chamber. Güldner obtained a patent on this engine, however, he did not patent the intake and exhaust valve overlap. It remains unknown to this day why Güldner never patented this concept. Driven by the success of the engine and Moritz Schröter's favourable review, Güldner founded his second company, Güldner-Motoren G.m.b.H. in München on 15 February 1904. Until his death on 12 March 1926, caused by a failed surgery, Güldner served as the managing director of this company.

== Works ==
- Güldner, Hugo (1914), Das Entwerfen und Berechnen der Verbrennungskraftmaschinen und Kraftgas-Anlagen (in German) (3 ed.), Berlin/Heidelberg: Springer, ISBN 978-3-662-24387-9
