= Two-stroke diesel engine =

Engine type

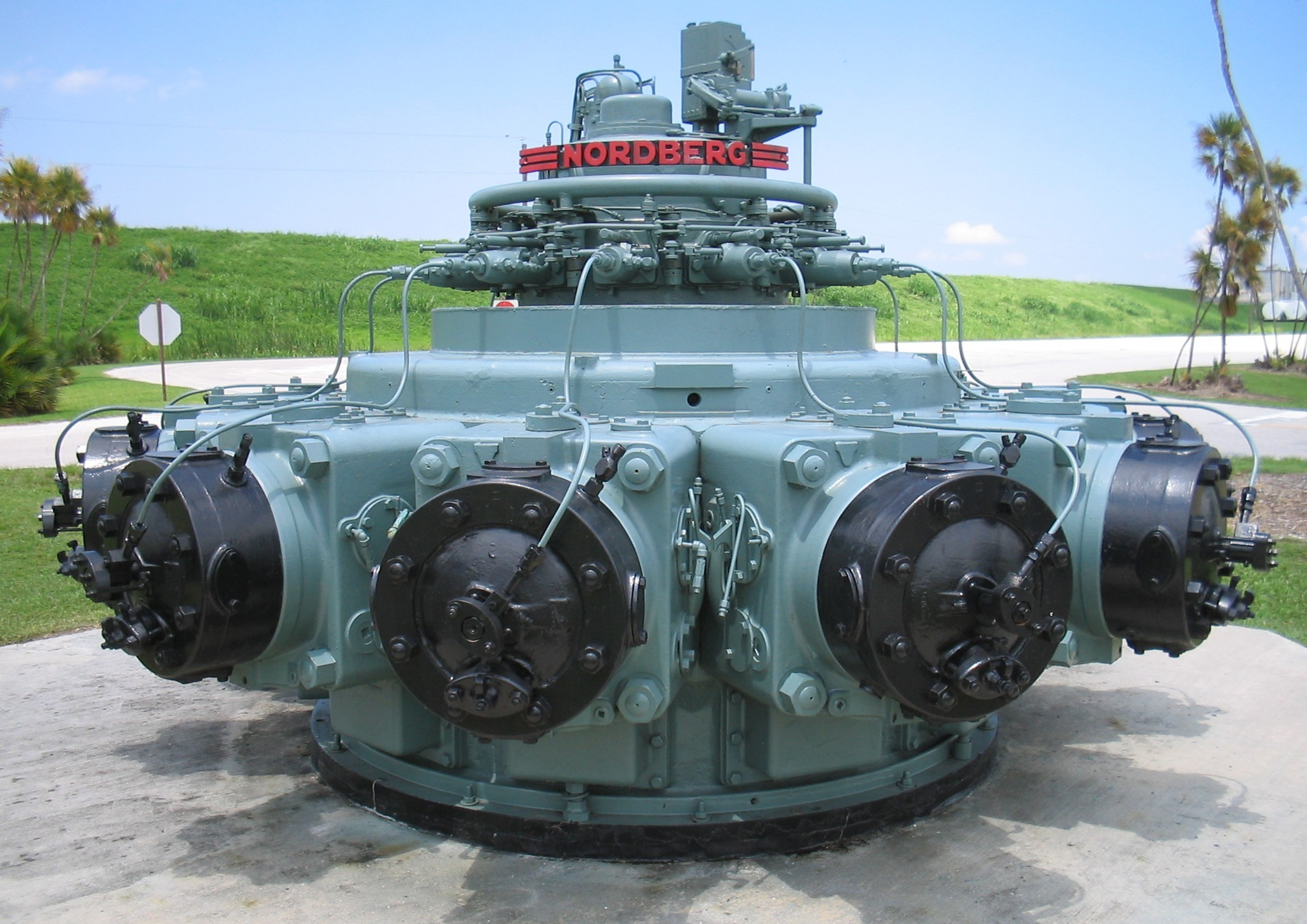
Nordberg two-stroke radial diesel engine formerly used in a pumping station at Lake Okeechobee

A two-stroke diesel engine is a diesel engine that uses compression ignition in a two-stroke combustion cycle. It was invented by Hugo Güldner in 1899.

In compression ignition, air is first compressed and heated; fuel is then injected into the cylinder, causing it to self-ignite. This delivers a power stroke each time the piston rises and falls, without any need for the additional exhaust and induction strokes of the four-stroke cycle.

== History ==
According to the engineer who drew up Rudolf Diesel‘s design for one of the first operational diesel engine, Motor 250/400, Imanuel Lauster, Diesel did not originally intend using the two-stroke principle for the diesel engine. Hugo Güldner designed what is believed to be the first operational two-stroke diesel engine in 1899, and he convinced MAN, Krupp and Diesel to fund building this engine with ℳ 10,000 each. Güldner's engine had a 175 mm work cylinder, and a 185 mm scavenging cylinder; both had a stroke of 210 mm. The indicated power output was 12 PS (9 kW; 12 hp). In February 1900, this engine ran under its own power for the first time. However, with its actual power output of only 6.95 PS (5 kW; 7 hp) and high fuel consumption of 380 g·PS^{−1}·h^{−1} (517 g·kW^{−1}·h^{−1}), it did not prove to be successful; Güldner's two-stroke diesel engine project was abandoned in 1901.

In 1908, MAN Nürnberg offered single-acting piston two-stroke diesel engines for marine use, the first double-acting piston engine from MAN Nürnberg was made in 1912 for an electric power plant. In collaboration with Blohm + Voss in Hamburg, MAN Nürnberg built the first double-acting piston two-stroke engine for marine use in 1913/1914. Paul Henry Schweitzer argues that the opposed piston two-stroke diesel engine was originally invented by Hugo Junkers. During World War I, MAN Nürnberg built a six-cylinder, double-acting piston, two-stroke diesel engine with a rated power of 12,400 PS (9,120 kW; 12,230 hp). MAN moved their two-stroke diesel engine department from Nürnberg to Augsburg in 1919.

By 1939, several two-stroke diesel types were in widespread use, and others were being developed for high-power applications.

Of several two-stroke aircraft diesel engine concepts, the Junkers Jumo 205 was the only type to be made in significant quantities, with approximately 900 units in all. Introduced in 1939, the design concept had first been proposed in 1914. The design was license-manufactured in several countries. Subsequent advances in petrol fuel injection technology rendered the two-stroke aircraft engine obsolete. Although the Napier Culverin, a licensed version of the larger Jumo 204, was not put into production, the later Napier Deltic incorporated a redesigned triangular arrangement with three cylinders per bank, and was successfully adopted in locomotive and marine applications, well into the postwar era.

From 1923 until 1982, MAN had been using reverse flow scavenging for their marine two-stroke engines. From 1945, a slide valve for the ram induction effect was installed, and from 1954, constant gas flow supercharging with intercooling was used. The supercharging was achieved with the combination of four supercharging methods: a crankshaft-driven roots type supercharger, a turbo supercharger, the engine pistons' undersides, and a supercharger powered by an electric motor. The slide valve for the ram induction effect eventually proved to be prone to failure and was rendered obsolete by increasing supercharging rates in the early 1960s. In the early 1980s, all major two-stroke diesel engine manufacturers switched from reverse flow scavenging to uniflow scavenging, because the latter, despite being more complicated, allows a higher engine efficiency and thus lower fuel consumption.

Charles F. Kettering and colleagues, working at the General Motors Research Corporation and GM's subsidiary Winton Engine Corporation during the 1930s, designed two-stroke diesel engines for on-road use with much higher power-to-weight ratios and output range than contemporary four-stroke diesels. The first mobile application of the two-stroke diesel engine was with the diesel streamliners of the mid-1930s. Continued development work resulted in improved two-stroke diesels for locomotive and marine applications in the late 1930s. This work laid the foundation for the dieselisation of railroads in the 1940s and 1950s in the United States.

Towards the end of the twentieth century, interest in aircraft diesel engines revived, with two-stroke examples such as the Superior Air Parts Gemini Diesel 100 under development as of 2015.

== Characteristics ==
=== Diesel or oil engines ===
The defining characteristic of the diesel engine is that it relies on compression ignition. As air is compressed it heats up. Fuel is then injected into the hot, compressed air and ignites spontaneously. This allows it to operate with a lean mixture comprising mainly air. Together with the high compression ratio, this makes it more economical than the petrol or gasoline Otto engine. It also does not require either a carburettor to mix the air and fuel before delivery, or a spark plug or other ignition system. Another consequence is that to control speed and power output, the airflow is not throttled but only the amount of fuel injected at each cycle is varied.

=== Two-stroke cycle ===
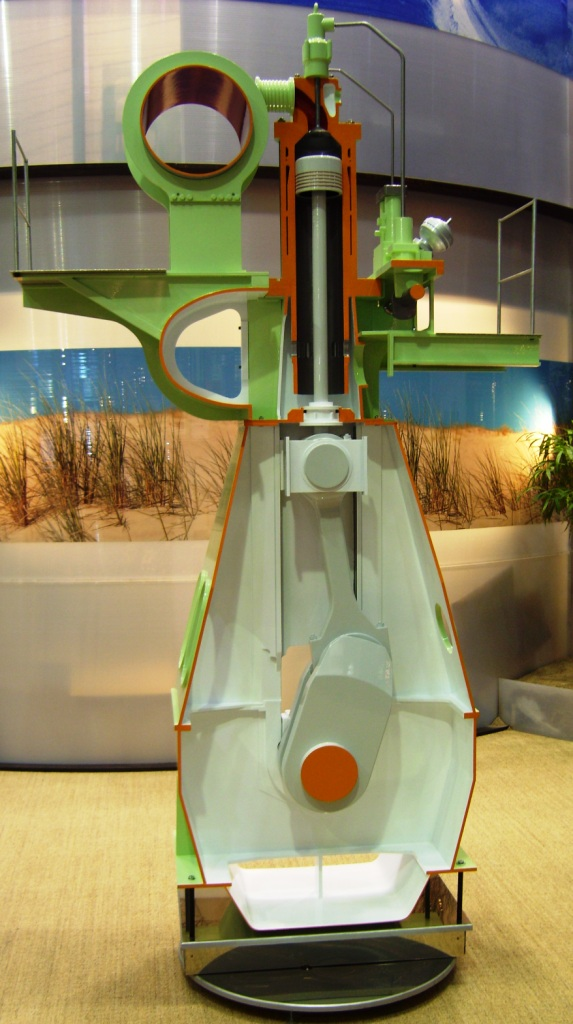
Cutaway model of a MAN B&W two-stroke marine diesel engine with the piston rod attached to a crosshead

In the two-stroke cycle, the four stages of internal combustion engine operation (intake, compression, ignition, exhaust) occur in one 360° revolution of the crank shaft, whereas in a four-stroke engine they take two complete revolutions. Consequently, in the two-stroke cycle the stages overlap through most of the engine's operation. This makes its thermodynamic and aerodynamic processes more complex. Because the four-stroke cylinder fires only every other revolution, the power output of the two-stroke cycle is theoretically twice as much. However, the scavenging losses make this advantage difficult to achieve in practice.

- Intake begins when the piston is near the bottom dead center (BDC). Air is admitted to the cylinder through ports in the cylinder wall (there are no intake valves). All two-stroke diesel engines require artificial aspiration to operate, and will either use a mechanically driven blower or a turbo-compressor to charge the cylinder with air. In the early phase of intake, the air charge is also used to force out any remaining combustion gases from the preceding power stroke, a process referred to as scavenging.
- As the piston rises, the intake charge of air is compressed. Near top dead center, fuel is injected, resulting in combustion due to the charge's extremely high pressure and heat created by compression, which drives the piston downward. As the piston moves downward in the cylinder, it will reach a point where the exhaust port is opened to expel the high-pressure combustion gasses. However, most current two-stroke diesel engines use top-mounted poppet valves and uniflow scavenging. Continued downward movement of the piston will expose the air intake ports in the cylinder wall, and the cycle will start again.

=== Two-stroke diesels ===
In most EMD and GM (i.e. Detroit Diesel) two-stroke engines, very few parameters are adjustable and all the remaining ones are fixed by the mechanical design of the engines. The scavenging ports are open from 45 degrees before BDC, to 45 degrees after BDC. However, some manufacturers make the scavenging port timing asymmetric by offsetting the crankshaft. The remaining, adjustable, parameters have to do with exhaust valve and injection timing (these two parameters are not necessarily symmetrical about TDC or, for that matter, BDC), they are established to maximize combustion gas exhaust and to maximize charge air intake. A single camshaft operates the poppet-type exhaust valves and the Unit injector, using three lobes: two lobes for exhaust valves (either two valves on the smallest engines or four valves on the largest, and a third lobe for the unit injector).

Specific to EMD two-stroke engines (567, 645, and 710):

- The power stroke begins at TDC ([0°]; injection of fuel leads TDC by 4° [356°], such that injection of fuel will be completed by TDC or very shortly thereafter; the fuel ignites as fast as it is injected), after the power stroke the exhaust valves are opened, thereby greatly reducing combustion gas pressure and temperature, and preparing the cylinder for scavenging, for a power stroke duration of 103°.
- Scavenging begins 32° later, at BDC–45° [135°], and ends at BDC+45° [225°], for a scavenging duration of 90 degrees; the 32° delay in opening the scavenging ports (constraining the length of the power stroke), and the 16° delay after the scavenging ports are closed (thereby initiating the compression stroke), maximizes scavenging effectiveness, thereby maximizing engine power output, while minimizing engine fuel consumption.
- Towards the end of scavenging, all products of combustion have been forced out of the cylinder, and only "charge air" remains (scavenging may be accomplished by Roots blowers, for charge air induction at slightly above ambient, or EMD's proprietary turbo-compressor, which acts as a blower during start-up and as a turbocharger under normal operational conditions, and for charge air induction at significantly above ambient, (Note: Horsepower for naturally aspirated engines (including Roots-blown two-stroke engines) is usually derated 2.5% per 1,000 feet (300 m) above mean sea level, a tremendous penalty at the 10,000 feet (3,000 m) or greater elevations, which several Western U.S. and Canada railroads operate, and this can amount to a 25% power loss. Turbocharging effectively eliminates this derating) and which turbocharging provides a 50-percent maximum rated power increase over Roots-blown engines of the same displacement).
- The compression stroke begins 16° later, at BDC+61° [241°], for a compression stroke duration of 119°.
- In EFI-equipped engines, the electronically controlled unit injector is still actuated mechanically; the amount of fuel fed into the plunger-type injector pump is under the control of the engine control unit (in locomotives, locomotive control unit), rather than the traditional Woodward PGE governor, or equivalent engine governor, as with conventional unit injectors.

Specific to GM two-stroke (6-71) and related on-road/off-road/marine two-stroke engines:

- The same basic considerations are employed (the GM/EMD 567 and the GM/Detroit Diesel 6-71 engines were designed and developed at the same time, and by the same team of engineers and engineering managers).
- Whereas all EMD and Detroit Diesel two-stroke engines employ forced induction, only some EMD engines employ a turbo-compressor system. Some Detroit Diesel engines employ a conventional turbocharger, in some cases with intercooling, followed by the usual Roots blower, as a turbo-compressor system would be too costly for certain very cost-sensitive and highly competitive applications.

=== Fuels ===
Fuels used in diesel engines can be composed of heavier hydrocarbon oils than the petrol or gasoline used in spark-ignition engines, making them less volatile with a higher flash point and giving them higher energy density. They are therefore easier and safer to handle and occupy less volume for a given amount of energy. Two stroke diesels usually burn even heavier grades of fuel oil than standard diesel fuels.

In two-stroke marine diesel engines for sea-going craft, the most common fuels are residue oils. Günter Mau argues that no uniform standards for such fuels exist, which is why they have several different colloquial names, including Marine Intermediate Fuel, Heavy Fuel Oil, Marine Bunker Fuel, and Bunker C Fuel. Heavy fuel oils were also used in the Jumo 205 two-stroke diesel aircraft engine. In the 1960s, residue oils were "concocted on the basis of refinery waste". Residue oils are of very low quality with high viscosity and low cetane numbers, but cheap and thus economical to use.

== Manufacturers ==
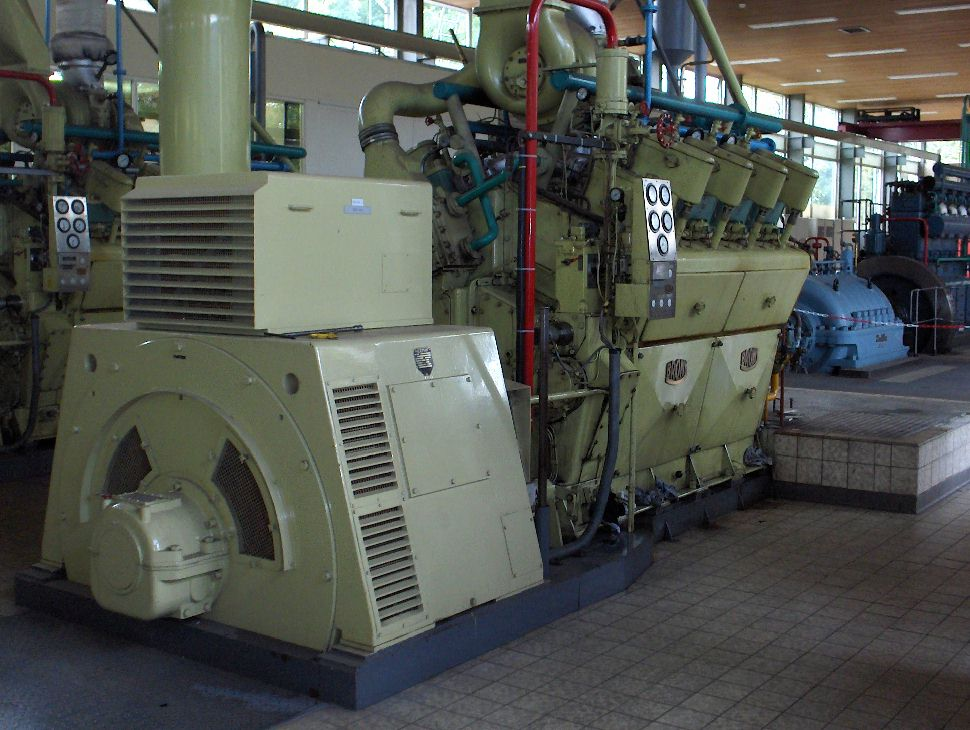
Brons two-stroke V8 diesel engine driving a Heemaf generator

- DeltaHawk DHK180 engine for aircraft propulsion burns Jet A & Jet A-1, JP5, JP8, Diesel (D1 and D2), JP-8-100, and F-24 fuels
- Burmeister & Wain (part of MAN Diesel since 1980), double-acting diesels for marine propulsion from 1930 onwards, also made by shipbuilders under licence
- Detroit Diesel, uniflow engines for on- and off-road trucks, on-road buses and stationary applications
- Doxford, opposed piston slow speed marine diesel engines.
- Electro-Motive Diesel, uniflow diesel engines for marine, railway and stationary applications
- Fairbanks-Morse, opposed-piston diesel engines for marine and stationary applications. An upscaled licensed copy of the Junkers Jumo 205 aero engine.
- Foden, FD series of diesel engines for commercial vehicle, marine and industrial power.
- Junkers, patent from 1892, opposed piston design for stationary, marine and automotive (single crankshaft) engines, later aircraft usage with dual crankshaft layout (Junkers Jumo 205).
- Gray Marine, 6-71 uniflow diesel engines.
- MAN Diesel & Turbo, crosshead diesel engines for marine propulsion
- Mitsubishi Heavy Industries, crosshead diesel engines for marine propulsion
- Napier & Son, Napier Deltic and Napier Culverin opposed-piston valveless, supercharged uniflow scavenged, two-stroke diesel engines. Starting out with licensed Junkers Jumo 205 derivative.
- Rootes Group, the Commer TS3 engine for trucks
- Wärtsilä, crosshead diesel engines for marine propulsion
- Waukesha Engine, large stationary reciprocating engines produced by INNIO Waukesha Gas Engines
  - Brons, a former Dutch engine manufacturer in Appingedam (now represented by Waukesha Engine)
