= Brons =

Dutch engine manufacturer

Appingedammer Bronsmotorenfabriek
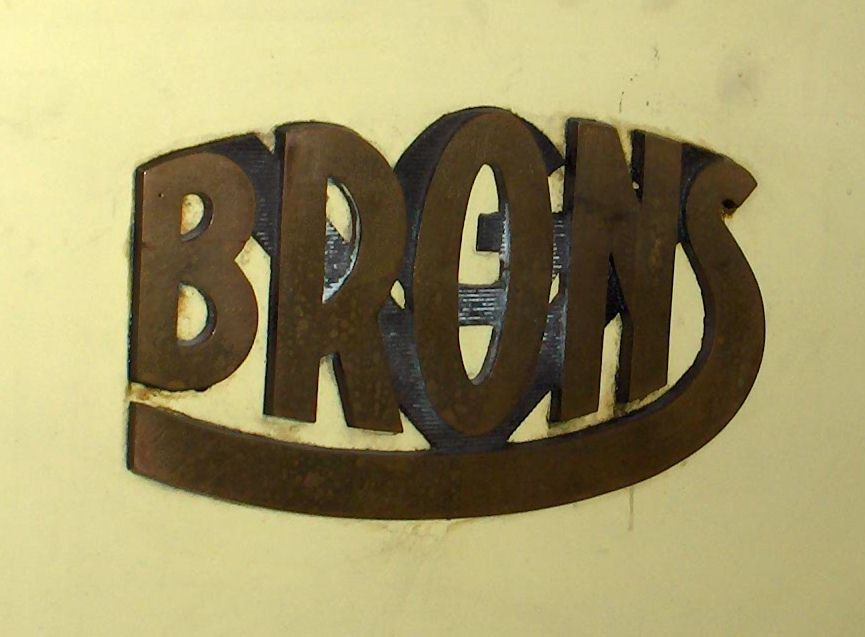

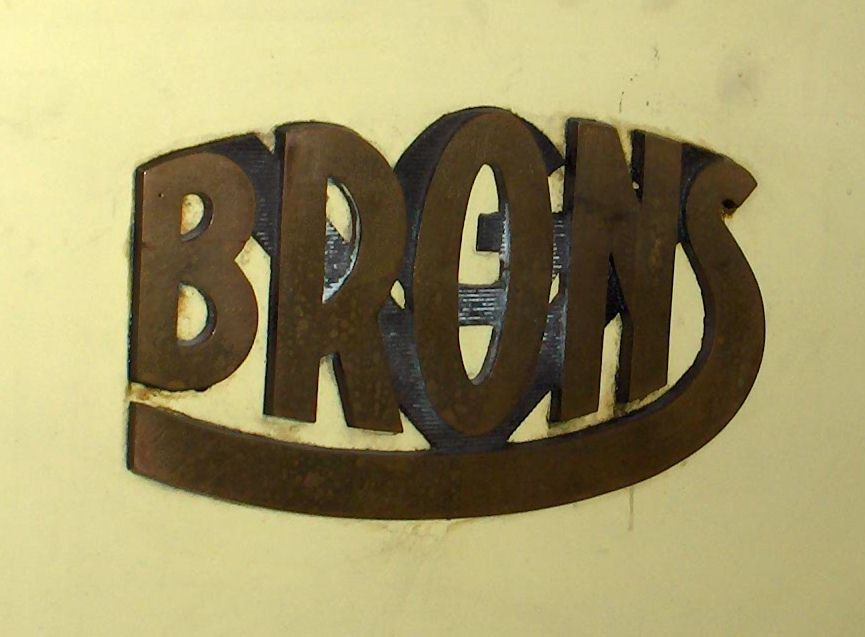
- Brons VG Motor logo
- Type: Naamloze vennootschap
- Industry: Manufacturing
- Founded: 1906
- Headquarters: Appingedam, The Netherlands
- Key people: Jan Brons
- Products: Diesel engines

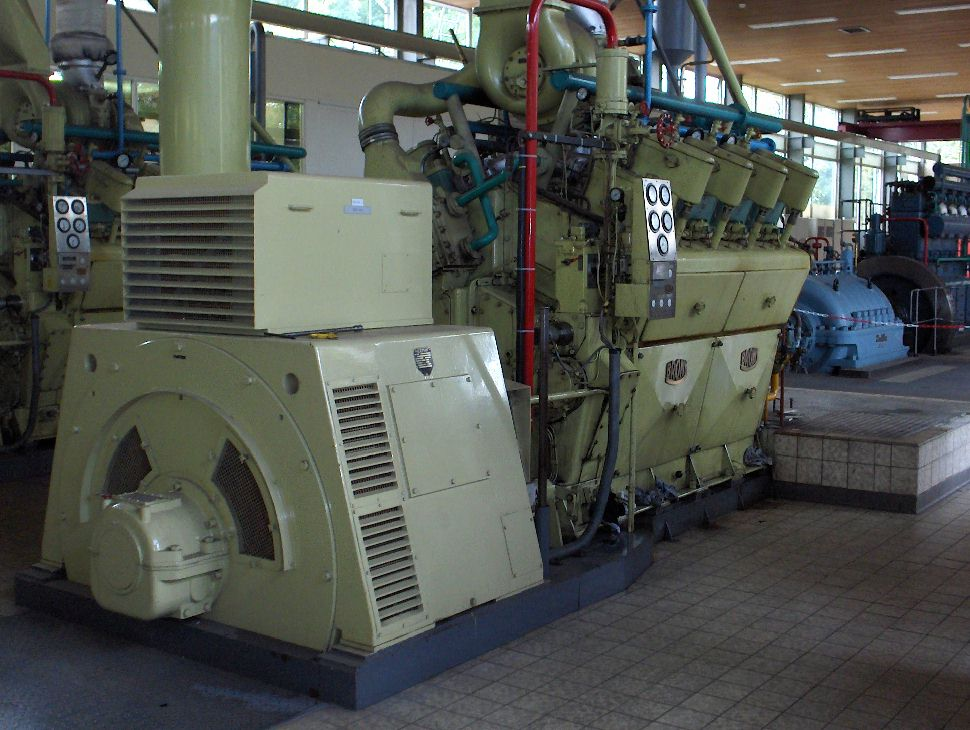
Brons two-stroke V8 diesel engine driving a N.V. Heemaf generator

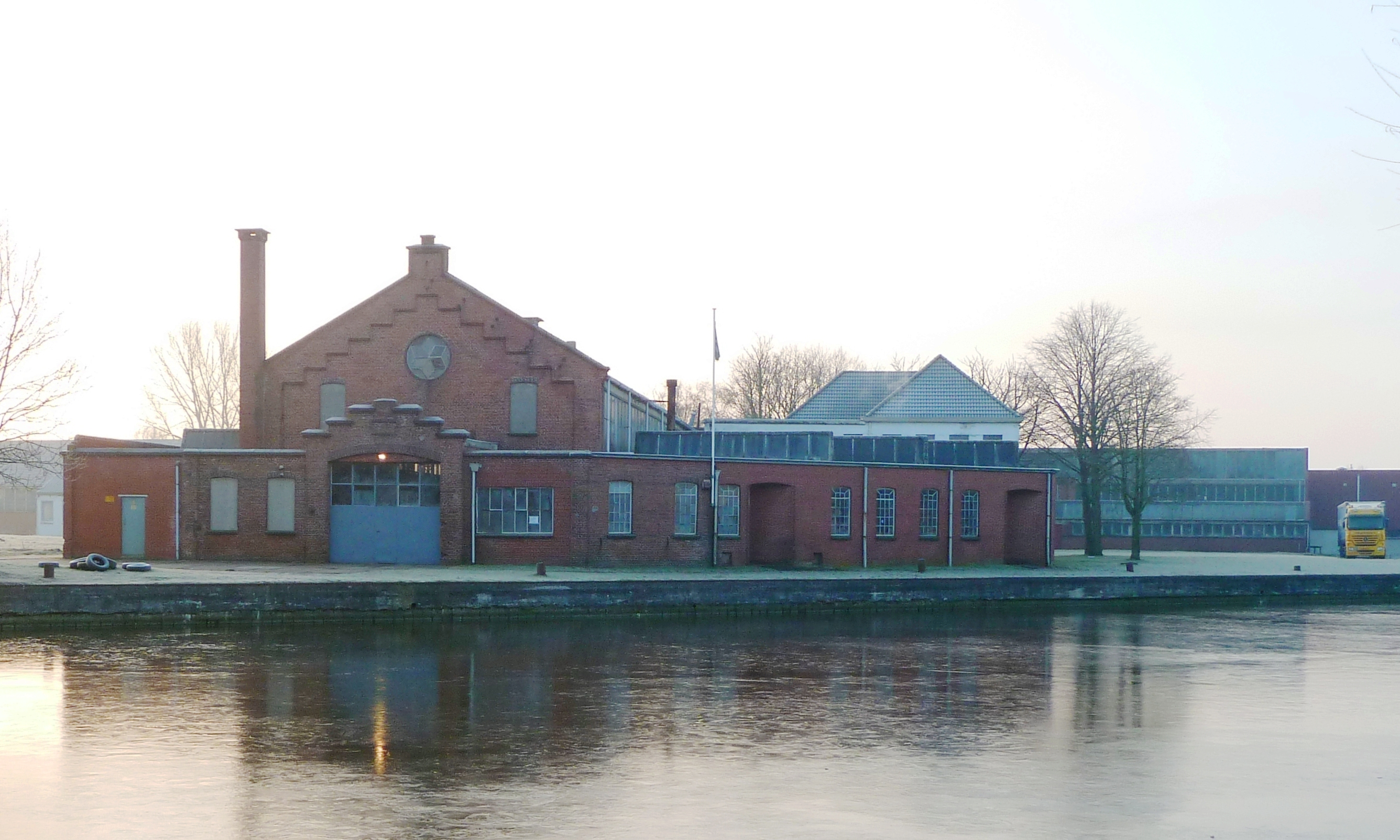
Brons engine factory in Appingedam, in business from 1907 to 2004

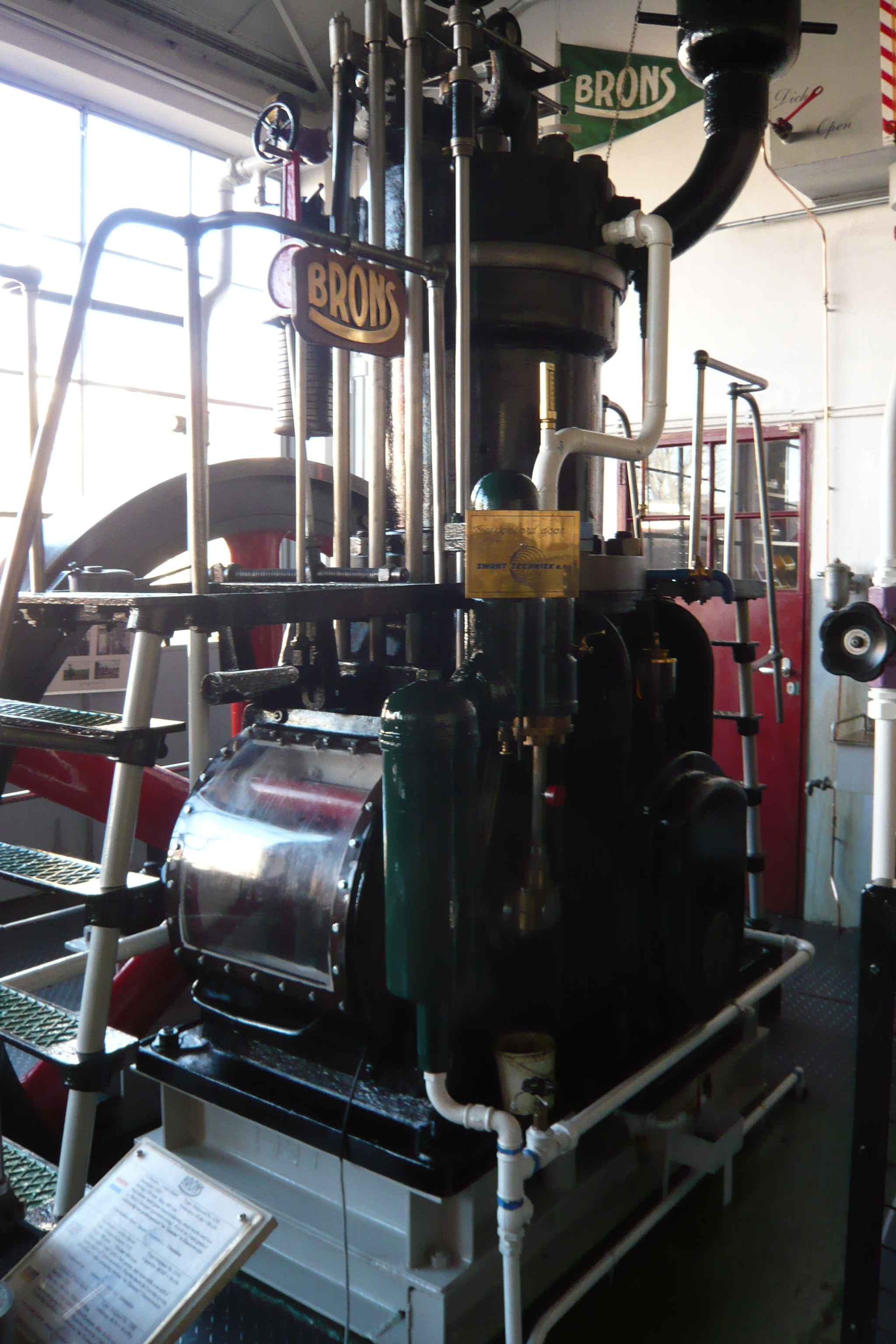
Brons engine in "De Tjamme" pumping station Finsterwolde, now on display in the IJmuider Zee- en Havenmuseum. It is a single cylinder, four-stroke diesel with spraying cup fuel injection, 1921

Brons, named after Jan Brons, was a Dutch engine manufacturer in Appingedam that existed from 1907 to 2004. The company made more than 4000 engines for large machines such as ships, tractors, and busses. The company is notable for its early stationary industrial motors and ship engines, but also for an early 1899 prototype light omnibus called "The Brons".

== History ==
Jan Brons (January 20, 1865 – February 9, 1954) first developed an autobus with a motor that ran on petroleum in 1890, but because he wanted it to run on petrol he then created the omnibus in 1899. It was for this omnibus that he later bought a patent (in Germany, because it was not possible to get a patent for it in the Netherlands). The bus was in service for some years until it broke a wheel. It was never in production. When Rudolf Diesel developed the diesel motor in the 1890s, Brons found it to be too complicated and invented a type of "spray cup" he called the "verstuiverbak" or "bakjesknapper" to simplify the fuel injection process. This method was later bought by HVID, that later patented their method.

In the 1930s the company tried to make a comeback with truck engines, full trucks have never been made, though a couple of Brons-tractors were built and sold.

=== Merger with De Industrie ===
In 1975 Brons and De Industrie were talking about a merger of both engine manufacturers. The merger would result in Brons taking over De Industrie, with each share worth 100 Dutch guilders of De Industrie being exchanged for shares worth 65 Dutch guilder of Brons. The name of Brons would also be changed from NV Appingedammer Bronsmotorenfabriek to Industrie-Brons Groep NV. At the time of the proposed merger Brons had 320 employees, while De Industrie had 180 employees. The merger was urged by the Dutch Ministry of Economic Affairs as a condition for state aid, which was needed for the further development of a new turbo-diesel engine. The merger would result in a company with a revenue of 30 million Dutch guilders. In addition, there was also hope that the merger would lead to more employment opportunities.

In 1977 it was reported that Brons-Industrie had lost 12.7 million Dutch guilders the previous year. The loss was a result of the downturn in the shipbuilding industry and the delays related to the introduction of the new turbo diesel engine. As a cost saving measure the engine manufacturing plant of De Industrie in Alphen aan den Rijn was closed and 25 employees at the Brons plant would be laid off. By 1979 Brons-Industrie still had financial trouble and there were discussions ongoing about 2.2 million state aid for the period 1979-1981, in return the company would have to lay off 50 of its 250 employees.

The company that made the car was known as the Appingedammer Bronsmotorenfabriek continued to manufacture heavy diesel engines for ships, electrical generators and pumps, later being taken over by US company Waukesha Engines. The archives of the company remain with a society devoted to preserving this industrial heritage.

== Patents ==
- US Patent 644814 Rotary Engine, Jan Brons, dated July 31, 1899
- US Patent 868839 Hydrocarbon Engine, Jan Brons & Nanno Timmer, dated October 7, 1907
- US Patent 1759776 Multicylinder Combustion Motor, Jan Brons & Naamloze Vennoot (nameless partner), dated January 7, 1927
