= Motor 250/400 =

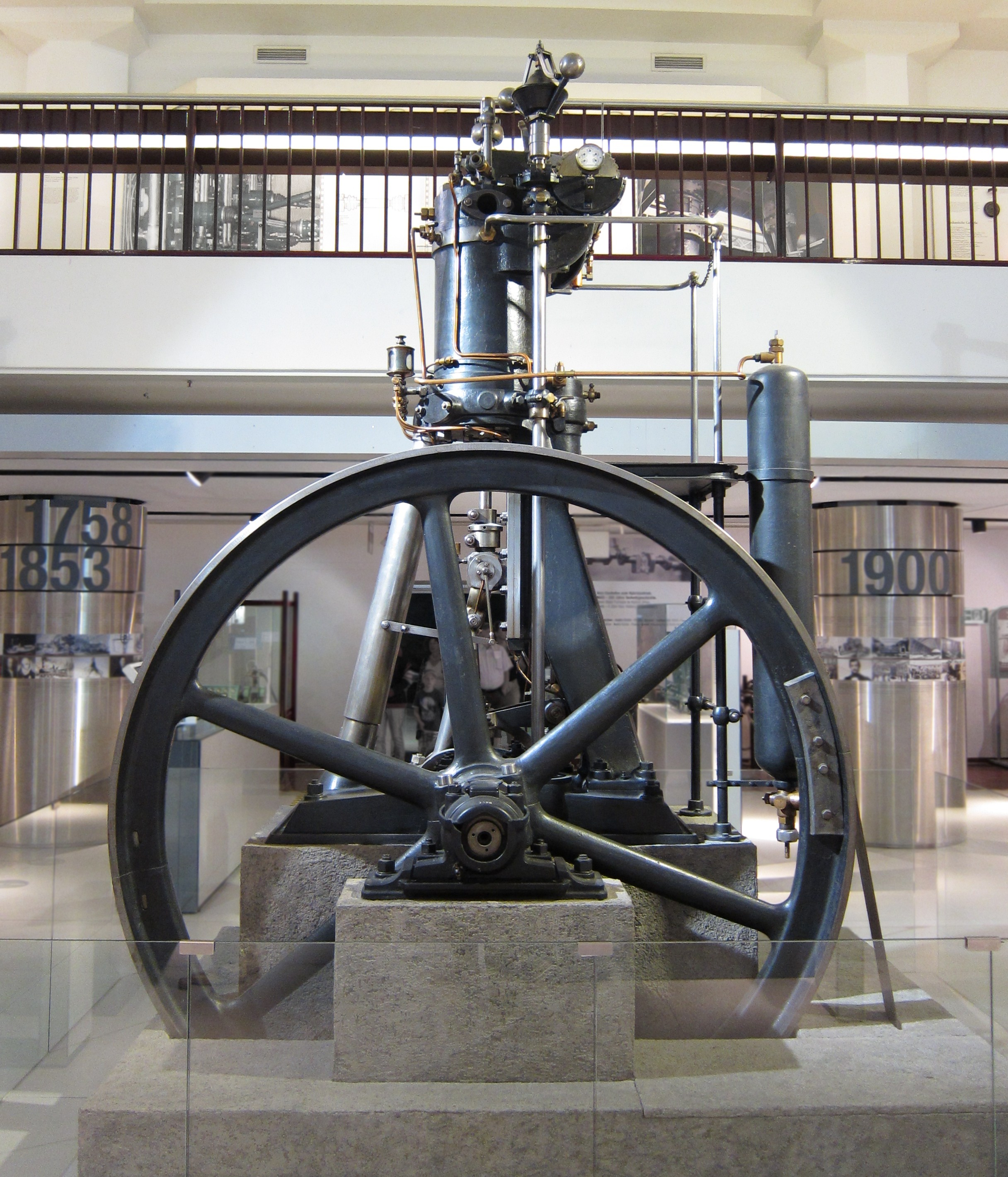
- B-Motor at the Deutsches Museum

Overview
- Manufacturer: Maschinenfabrik Augsburg
- Designer: Rudolf Diesel (concept); Imanuel Lauster (drawings)
- Production: 30 April 1896 – 6 October 1896

Layout
- Configuration: Single-cylinder A-type, crosshead piston
- Displacement: 19,635 cm^{3} (1,198.2 in^{3})
- Cylinder bore: 250 mm (9.84 in)
- Piston stroke: 400 mm (15.75 in)
- Cylinder block material: Grey cast iron
- Cylinder head material: Grey cast iron
- Valvetrain: OHC, 2 valves

Combustion
- Operating principle: Diesel
- Supercharger: Piston-type supercharger + intercooler (until 28 January 1897); None (from 28 January 1897)
- Fuel system: Air-blast injection
- Fuel type: Kerosine; Petrol; Ligroin; Coal-tar creosote oil Paraffin oil Gas oil Fuel oil Solar oil Naphtha; Benzene; Shale oil Peanut oil Mains gas
- Oil system: Manual
- Cooling system: Water-cooled

Output
- Power output: 13.1 kW (17.8 PS) at 154/min
- Torque output: 812 N⋅m (82.8 kp⋅m) at 154/min

Dimensions
- Diameter: 3,000 mm (120 in) (flywheel)

Chronology
- Predecessor: Motor 220/400

The Motor 250/400 is the first functional diesel engine. It was designed by Rudolf Diesel, and drawn by Imanuel Lauster. The workshop of the Maschinenfabrik Augsburg built two units, the A-Motor, and the B-Motor. The latter has been on static display at the Deutsches Museum in Munich since testing it came to an end. Throughout the late 1890s, several licensed copies of the Motor 250/400 were made. Most of these copies were very unreliable, which almost caused the diesel engine's demise.

== History ==
=== Development ===
In early 1893, Rudolf Diesel had contracted with both Maschinenfabrik Augsburg and Krupp in Essen to develop an engine based on his essay Theory and Construction of a Rational Heat Motor. However, by mid-1893 Diesel had realised that the rational heat motor would not work, and he modified his design. This modified design would later be known as the diesel engine. The first prototype, Motor 150/400, was completed on 12 July 1893. Initial tests with it proved the concept, and by October 1895, after the first prototype had been converted into the second prototype Motor 220/400, it had become clear that, a completely new engine had to be designed from scratch. On 20 February 1896, Krupp, Maschinenfabrik Augsburg, and Diesel decided to start the development of the new engine. The new engine was supposed to be a 250 mm bore engine with a 400 mm stroke. On 5 March 1896, Diesel filed a patent application for supercharging combined with intercooling; on 26 March, it was decided to build the new engine with a supercharger.

In order to improve the efficiency of the development process, a new design bureau was built directly into Diesel's Augsburg testing laboratory. Several young engineers worked there, including Imanuel Lauster, who drew the Motor 250/400. Friedrich Sass writes that Lauster did most of the drawing work himself, but considers that Diesel's assistant Nadrowski might have assisted Lauster. On 30 April 1896, after Lauster had completed the drawings, the workshop at Augsburg began making parts for the engine.

=== Building and post-design phase ===
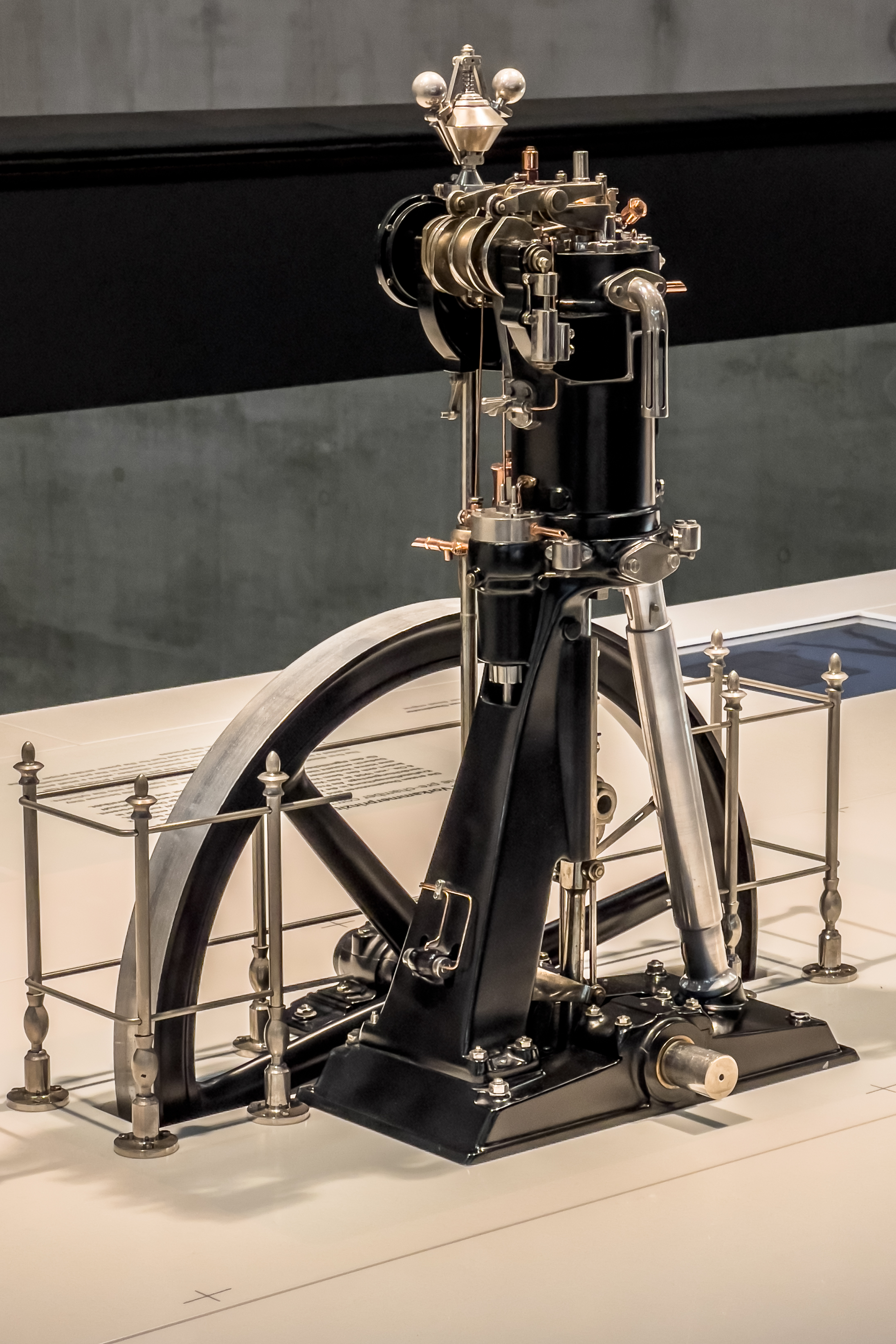
Rear view (1:5 scale model)

The cylinder casting worked without any problems, and the first cylinder cast was used. On 25 July 1896, it was pressure-tested with water at a pressure of 80 atm (8.1 MPa); only few leaks were found. The cylinder head however was difficult to make, therefore, two were cast for testing purposes – both proved to be porous at a water pressure of 50 atm (5.1 MPa) and thus unusable. Lauster and the casting foreman at Maschinenfabrik Augsburg had to redesign the cylinder head several times; in total, five units had to be made. by 6 October 1896, the first engine was completed and ready for testing. In December 1896, Lauster was given a pay rise and a bonus of 3,000 mark for designing the Motor 250/400; the final modifications to the engine were made in early January 1897.

=== Post-completion phase ===
On 17 February 1897, Moritz Schröter conducted the engine's official test. The engine proved successful, even though the fuel system was unreliable. Schröter's test though convinced engineers and industrialists alike that, the engine was ready for series production. Schröter concluded "that we are beholding a quite marketable machine that has been thoroughly designed with great attention to every single detail." At this time, several firms bought licences for building legal copies of the Motor 250/400. It was believed that copies of the engine would work well without any issues, because the Motor 250/400 at Augsburg worked perfectly due to the extensive care and maintenance it received.

In summer of 1898, Paul Meyer and Ludwig Noé, who worked for Diesel, designed the "Kollektiv-Ausstellung von Dieselmotoren" (collective exhibition of diesel engines) in a wooden shack on the former Coal Island in München. It was planned to exhibit five copies of the Motor 250/400 built by several licensees, but only four were completed in time. The completion of these engines was rushed, and the first runs of these engines were only conducted after they had been installed at the exhibition. Several problems arose, most notably, loud banging at engine startup.

Soon after the exhibition, other copies of the Motor 250/400 built by licensees began failing. Unlike the Motor A and B, these copies were treated like steam engines of the time and often overloaded, which caused piston and fuel injector defects among other problems. A significant safety problem was the air-blast pump which was prone to exploding due to compression ignition of its lubrication oil. The fuel injector was unreliable due to its atomiser's fragile brass gauze; improperly wound gauzes resulted in a sooty exhaust and power loss. Friedrich Sass argues that a lack of experience with the diesel engine caused these failures, and that they almost resulted in the diesel engine's demise. However, Sass also describes that an engine installed by Noé at Aktie-Bolag Diesels Motorer in Stockholm worked without major problems from 1900. Burmeister & Wain in København finally redesigned the fuel injector's atomiser, which solved one of the engine's major problems.

== Technical description ==
The Motor 250/400 is a water-cooled, single-cylinder, A-type (crankcase-less) engine with a crosshead piston. It is a low-speed, four-stroke diesel engine with a rated engine speed of 160/min. With a cylinder bore of 250 mm and a piston stroke of 400 mm, it displaces about 19.6 litres. Although designed and built as a double-acting piston engine with the underside of the piston acting as a supercharging pump, the engine was run naturally aspirated from 28 January 1897, because of efficiency losses caused by incomplete expansion. Helmut Pucher (2012) argues that the volume of the compressed air cylinder that the supercharging pump fed its air into was too small, and that Diesel should have designed the engine with more supercharging pump valve clearance. Pucher also describes that Diesel considered using an intercooler for the engine.

The engine's cylinder is made of grey cast iron and has a cooling jacket, the crossflow cylinder head is also made of cast iron. The combustion chamber is located in between the piston and the cylinder head, the fuel is directly injected into it with air-blast injection, an early form of direct injection. Thus, the engine has a fuel injector, which is built into the centre of the cylinder head, in between the intake and exhaust valves. The engine was fitted with two separate valves, an inlet valve, and an outlet valve. Unlike its predecessor, it had separate intake and exhaust ports. The piston is made of iron, hollow, and water-cooled; it has four compression rings. The crankpin is also water-cooled.

The fuel pump is mounted above the cylinder head and driven by the camshaft, the air-blast pump is cast onto the cylinder and driven via a lever by two connecting rods from the engine's piston rod. Like all air-blast injected diesel engines, the Motor 250/400 has a compressed gas bottle for the injection air. It is made of welded steel, and also used for starting the engine (compressed air starting). For safety reasons, the engine was fitted with several safety valves, and had some of its tubes designed for gases filled with pebbles and wire wool. The engine was designed for kerosine, but could also burn several other types of fuel, including petrol, oils, and mains gas.

== Technical specifications and performance characteristics ==
The Motor 250/400 was tested extensively and eventually proved to be the most efficient engine of its time, reaching a thermal efficiency of more than 38 %. Out of the many tests, Moritz Schröter's test conducted on 17 February 1897 was the engine's official test; the effective power was 17.8 PS (13.1 kW) at 154/min. According to Diesel, the engine was designed with an indicated power of 20 PS_{i} (14.7 kW_{i}). It had rated speed of 160/min, and could still operate normally at a speed of 40/min with a low load.

Date of testing	Tester	Aspiration	Load	Thermal efficiency	Mean effective pressure	Power	Fuel consumption	Fuel type	Source
12 January 1897	Diesel	Supercharger set to 100%	100%	24%	9.2 kp/cm^{2} (0.9 MPa)	>15 PS (11.0 kW)	396 g/PSh (538 g/kWh)	Kerosine	
28 January 1897	Diesel	Supercharger removed	100%	31.9%	8.0 kp/cm^{2} (0.8 MPa)		258 g/PSh (351 g/kWh)	Kerosine	
28 January 1897	Diesel	Supercharger removed	50%	38.4%			264 g/PSh (359 g/kWh)	Kerosine	
1 February 1897	Dyckhoff	Supercharger removed	100%			18.3 PS (13.5 kW) at 158/min	250 g/PSh (340 g/kWh)	Kerosine	
1 February 1897	Dyckhoff	Supercharger removed	100%	34–38%			234 g/PSh (318 g/kWh)	Kerosine	
17 February 1897	Schröter	Supercharger removed	100%	34.2%		17.8 PS (13.1 kW) at 154/min	238 g/PSh (324 g/kWh)	Kerosine	
17 February 1897	Schröter	Supercharger removed	50%	38.4%			277 g/PSh (377 g/kWh)	Kerosine	
21 October 1897	Diesel	Supercharger removed	100%	38.7%			211 g/PSh (287 g/kWh)	Kerosine	
