= Arent Tonko Vos =

Dutch lawyer, writer, and librettist (1875–1954)

Arent Tonko Vos (21 June 1875, in Appingedam – 22 November 1954 in Appingedam) was a Dutch lawyer, writer, and librettist, best remembered for his 1918 opera Saskia about Saskia van Uylenburgh and Rembrandt. A graduate of the University of Groningen, he also served as president of Brons. A member of the Maatschappij der Nederlandse Letterkunde, he also wrote plays and worked towards the conservation of the Gronings dialect.
