= Siegmund Günther =

Adam Günther
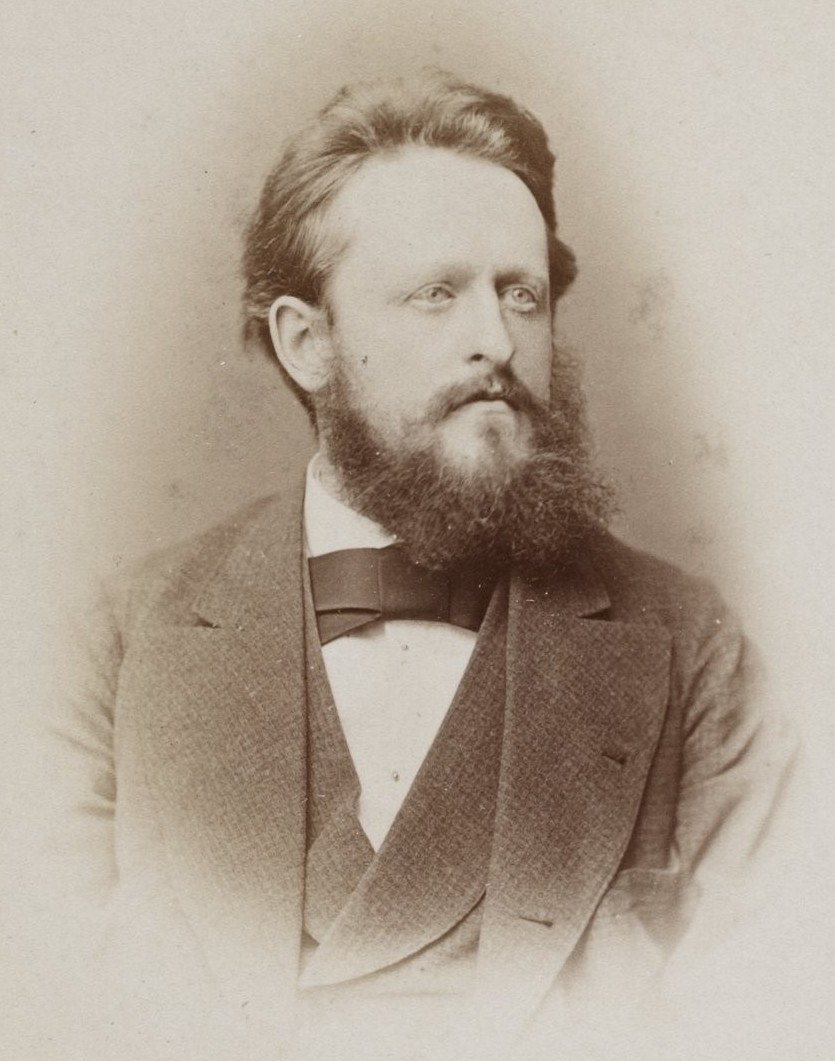

Rector of the Technical University of Munich
- In office 1911–1913
- Preceded by: Moritz Schröter
- Succeeded by: Heinrich von Schmidt

Personal details
- Born: 6 February 1848 Nuremberg, Kingdom of Bavaria
- Died: 3 February 1923 (aged 74) Munich, Weimar Republic
- Scientific career
- Fields: Mathematics
- Thesis: Studien zur theoretischen Photometrie (1872)

Adam Wilhelm Siegmund Günther (6 February 1848 – 3 February 1923) was a German geographer, mathematician, historian of mathematics and natural scientist.

== Early life ==
Born in 1848 to a German businessman, Günther would go on to attend several German universities including Erlangen, Heidelberg, Leipzig, Berlin, and Göttingen.

== Career ==
In 1872 he began teaching at a school in Weissenburg, Bavaria. He completed his habilitation thesis on continued fractions entitled Darstellung der Näherungswerte der Kettenbrüche in independenter Form in 1873. The next year he began teaching at Munich Polytechnicum. In 1876, he began teaching at a university in Ansbach where he stayed for several years before moving to Munich and becoming a professor of geography until he retired; he served as the university's rector from 1911 to 1913.

For some years, Günther was a member of the federal parliament, the Reichstag, and later the Bavarian parliament, representing liberal parties.

His mathematical work included works on the determinant, hyperbolic functions, and parabolic logarithms and trigonometry.

== Publications (selection) ==
- Darstellung der Näherungswerthe der Kettenbrüche in independenter Form. Eduard Besold, Erlangen, 1873
- Vermischte Untersuchungen zur Geschichte der mathematischen Wissenschaften. Teubner, Leipzig, 1876
- Lehrbuch der Determinanten-Theorie für Studirende. Eduard Besold, Erlangen, 1877
- Die Lehre von den gewöhnlichen und verallgemeinerten Hyperbelfunktionen. Louis Nebert, Halle, 1881
- Parabolische Logarithmen und parabolische Trigonometrie. Teubner, Leipzig, 1882
