= Imanuel Lauster =

German engineer

- Imanuel Lauster

Head of M.A.N.'s board of directors
- In office 1932–1934

Personal details
- Born: 28 January 1873 Münster am Neckar, Stuttgart. Württemberg, Germany
- Died: 15 March 1948 (aged 75) Leitershofen, Stadtbergen, Bavarian Swabia, Germany
- Education: G. Kuhn Maschinen- und Kesselfabrik (1888–1892); Esslingen University of Applied Sciences (1892–1894); Karlsruhe Institute of Technology (1894–1895)
- Scientific career
- Known for: Designing the first functional Diesel engine
- Fields: Mechanical engineering

Imanuel Lauster (28 January 1873 – 15 March 1948) was a German engineer and businessman, who worked for Rudolf Diesel and drew up Diesel’s design for the first Diesel engine, Motor 250/400. He also served as the head of M.A.N.'s board of directors from 1932 to 1934.

== Life and career ==
Lauster was born in Münster am Neckar, a small municipality then just to the north-east of Stuttgart (into which it was subsumed in 1923). He lived a youth "full of privation". On 1 April 1888, he joined Gottlieb Kuhn Maschinen- und Kesselfabrik in Stuttgart-Berg. The firm's workshop did not need fitter apprentices at the time, therefore, Lauster was taught technical drawing at the design bureau before he started working as a fitter at the workshop in 1889. Later, Lauster also assembled steam engines, and tested them on a dynamometer. In 1891, Lauster was assigned to the newly founded internal combustion engine workshop of G. Kuhn, where he had to build 6 PS and 8 PS Langensiepen engines with glowtube ignition. He was also responsible for demonstrating and explaining these engines to customers.

After his G. Kuhn apprenticeship, Lauster studied mechanical engineering at Königliche Baugewerkschule in Stuttgart. Lauster was a good student who had excellent grades. In 1894, after his graduation, Lauster began working as the assistant of Georg Lindner, who was, at the time, professor at Karlsruhe Institute of Technology (KIT). While working as Lindner's assistant, Lauster studied electronics and also attended lectures about petroleum at KIT. In December 1895, Lauster applied for a job as an engineer in Rudolf Diesel's engine laboratory at Maschinenfabrik Augsburg (later M.A.N.), where he started working on 2 January 1896.

Lauster's first assigned task was to design Rudolf Diesel's third prototype engine Motor 250/400, which would later prove to be the first functional Diesel engine; by 30 April 1896, he had completed the drawings. Friedrich Sass argues that Lauster might have received help from Diesel's assistant Nadrowski, but Sass believes that Lauster did most of the design work himself. In December 1896, Lauster received a pay rise and a bonus of 3000 Mark – an unusually high amount of money for a junior engineer – for designing this engine. In 1898, Lauster was ordered to modify the first commercial Diesel engine at a match factory in Kempten. On 3 March 1899, Lauster became the successor of Vogt at M.A.N.; in 1902, he was assigned the position of a senior engineer, and in 1904, he became head of M.A.N.'s Diesel engine department. In 1913, Lauster joined M.A.N.'s board of directors, whose head he became in 1932. In July 1934, Lauster was forced to resign, after his son-in-law made deals for M.A.N. that led to confiscation of payments made to M.A.N.. From 1931 until 9 May 1933, Lauster was a member of the German Association of Engineer's board of directors.

== Inventions and works ==
Lauster's most notable work is drawing up Rudolf Diesel’s design for the first functional Diesel engine, Motor 250/400. Among other later modifications, he designed an improved governor for the first commercially used Diesel engine. Friedrich Sass also believes that Lauster designed an improved fuel injector vaporiser for the Diesel engine. In 1901, Lauster designed the first trunk piston Diesel engine – the MAN DM series – together with Wilhelm Eberle, and in 1904, they designed the first submarine Diesel engine; however, it was never built.

== Lauster and Diesel ==
Soon after Lauster joined his team, Rudolf Diesel realised that Lauster was a great engineer. In 1896, Diesel initiated Lauster's bonus and pay rise at Maschinenfabrik Augsburg, and in July 1900, Diesel sent Lauster a "gratification" of 500 Mark. However, Lauster and Diesel never became friends. Later in his life, Diesel developed animosity towards Lauster, according to one source possibly caused by Diesel's belief that Lauster tried to hinder the Diesel engine's success, which made Diesel express in his journal that Lauster's contribution towards the Diesel engine was only minor.
