= Julius Magg =

Julius Magg (25 November 1884 – 5 May 1931) was an Austrian engineer and university professor. In the early 20th century, he contributed significantly to the further development of the Diesel engine. Later, he was known as the founder of the Graz method of engine design.

== Life and career ==
Julius Magg was born into a civil servant family in Wilten. He studied Mechanical Engineering at the Technical University of Graz and philosophy at the University of Berlin. When he graduated, he was awarded for outstanding academic performance. In 1907, he obtained a PhD in Technical Science and worked as an engineer for Andritz in Graz and for Hantel und Lueg in Düsseldorf. In 1910, Magg returned to Graz and became a university lecturer teaching theoretical machine design until he became a deputy professor for thermodynamics.

At a visit in Vöcklabruck, Magg met Charlotte Horzeyschny, who then studied Geography and History at the University of Graz. They got married in 1910. Charlotte and Julius Magg had no natural children but adopted a son in 1924. In World War I, Magg was ordered to build a steel mill. Starting in 1920, Magg, now Professor for Thermodynamics and Internal Combustion Engines, helped planning the new building for the Mechanical Engineering Faculty of the Graz University of Technology where he installed a laboratory for internal combustion engines. At this time, Magg and his wife lived in Geidorf. After suffering a stroke in 1930, he had to stop working as a university professor; not recovering from the stroke, Julius Magg died on 5 May 1931. Hans List continued Magg's work. His unpublished works are kept in the Styrian state archive.

== Published works ==
- Steuerungsdiagramm für Viertaktmaschinen in Vereins deutscher Ingenieure journal, 1913, issue 57, pp. 263.
- Die Steuerungen der Verbrennungskraftmaschinen. Springer-Verlag. Berlin. 1914. ISBN 978-3-642-47608-2
- Dieselmaschinen. Grundlagen, Bauarten, Probleme VDI-Verlag Berlin. 1928.
