= IJmuider Zee- en Havenmuseum =

Coordinates: 52.4574°N 4.5986°E

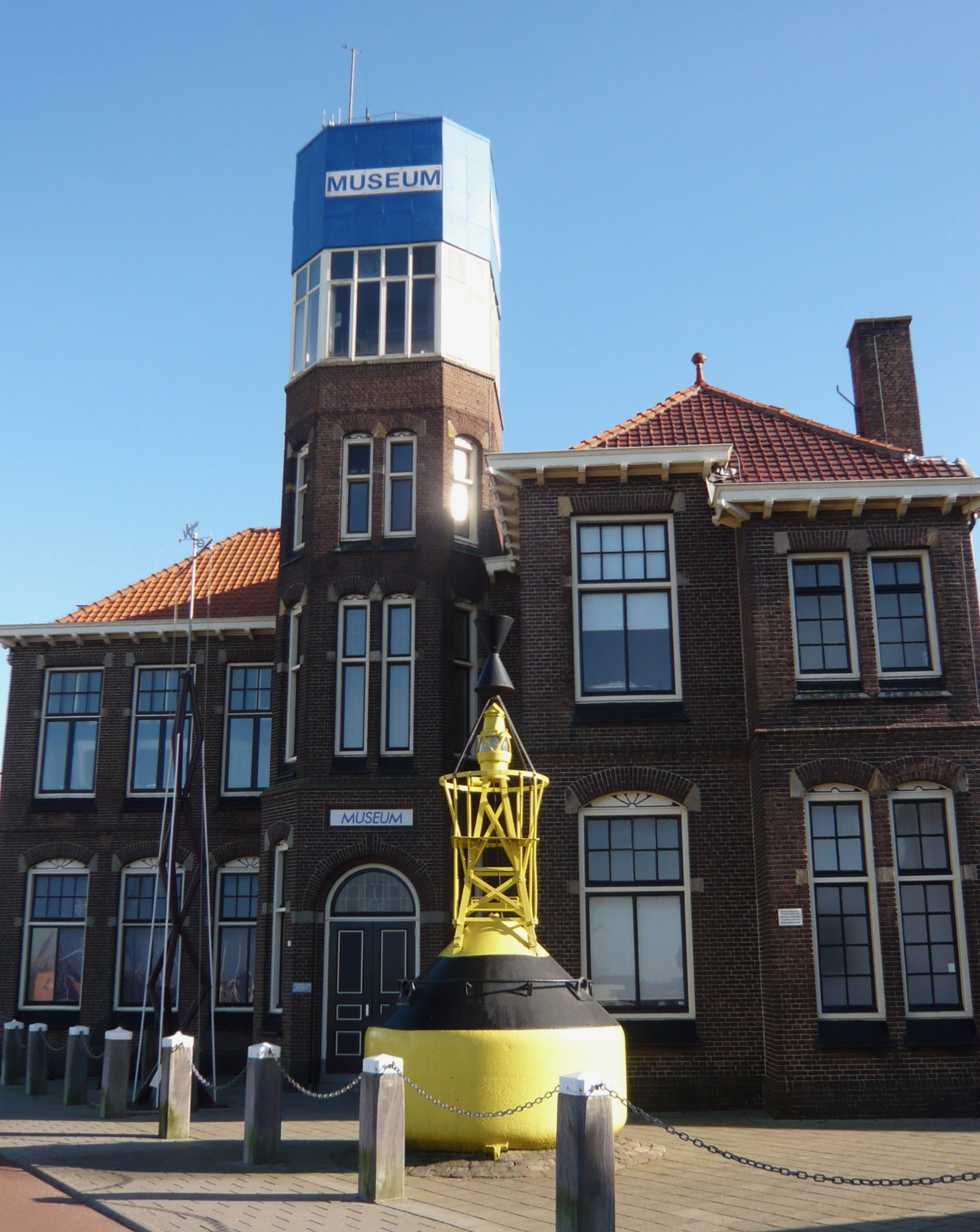
Museum on the Havenkade

The IJmuider Zee- en Havenmuseum is a museum located at the start of the Vissershaven in IJmuiden, the Netherlands, dedicated to promoting interest and conserving the fishing and shipping cultural heritage of IJmuiden and the North Sea Canal.

== History ==
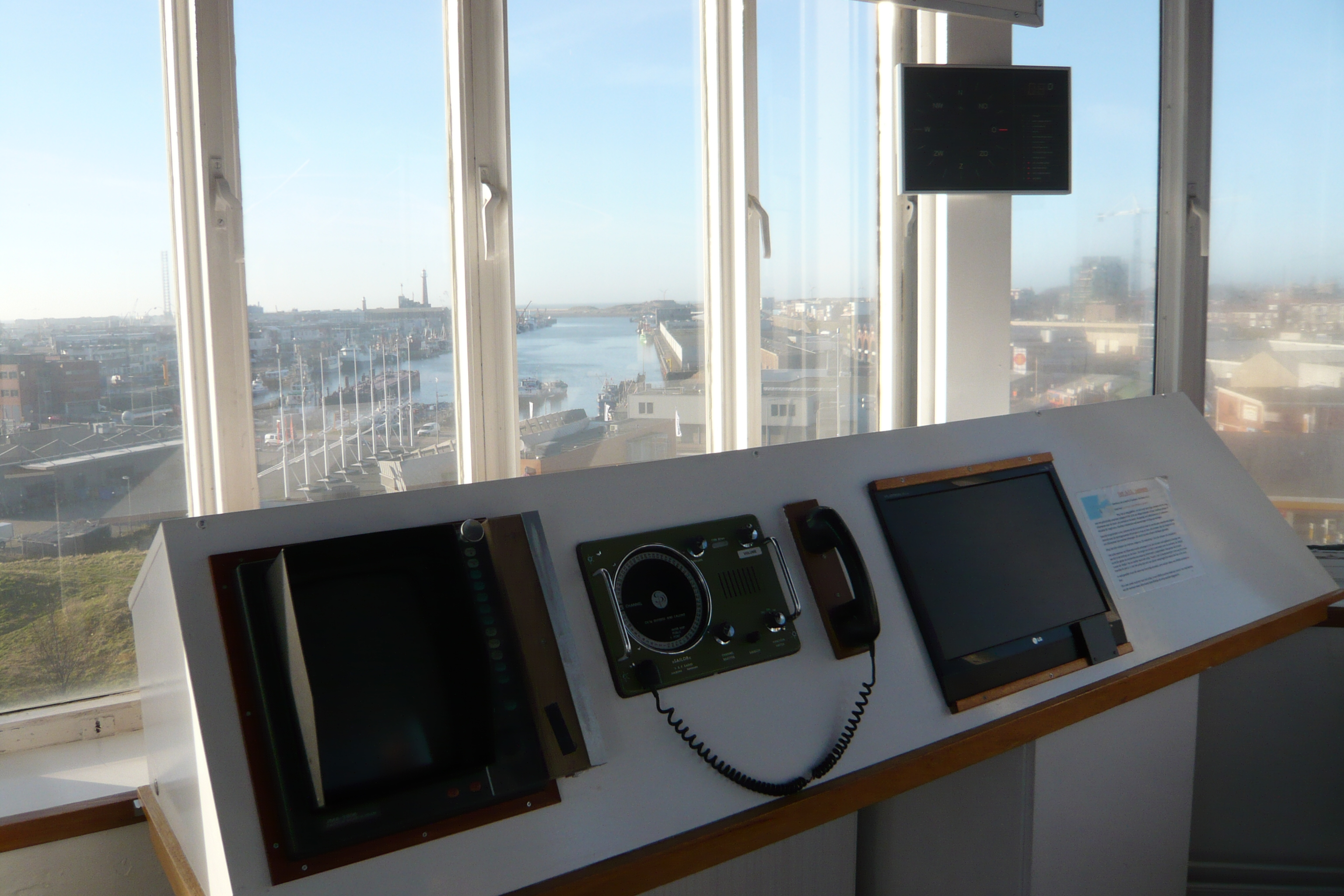
Inside, the museum has four floors of exhibition rooms, including a working radar installation in the tower that lets the visitor view and hear the activities in the harbour.

The museum was opened in 1989 in order to preserve the location, the old school for fishery, which closed due to a decrease in pupils.

The museum was restored and is kept open by a large group of enthusiastic volunteers who actively work on the collection of model ships, working machine engines, and radio equipment. Contact information is available on the website.

The museum is open Wednesdays, Saturdays and Sundays from 13:00 to 17:00. Admission is 6 euros (discounts for 65+ and children). The museum also houses a library which works together with the Velsen public library. There is a café, restrooms, and parking is available in front of the museum on the street. The museum has space for temporary art exhibitions and can be booked for events.
