= Friedrich Sass =

German engineer and historian (1883–1968)

Personal details
- Born: 6 January 1883 Koldenbüttel, Schleswig, German empire
- Died: 26 February 1968 (aged 85) West-Berlin, Berlin, West Germany
- Education: Gymnasium Schleswig; Technical University of Munich; Technische Universität Berlin
- Scientific career
- Known for: Marine Diesel engines with direct (air-blast-less) injection; Geschichte des deutschen Verbrennungsmotorenbaus von 1860 bis 1918
- Awards: Goldene Ehrennadel der Schiffbautechnischen Gesellschaft
- Fields: Mechanical engineering; Marine engineering; History of the internal combustion engine

Friedrich Sass (6 January 1883 – 26 February 1968) was a German engineer, university professor, and historian.

== Life and career ==
Friedrich Sass was born in Koldenbüttel and attended the Gymnasium (grammar school) in Schleswig. He studied mechanical engineering at the Technical University of Munich, and marine engineering at Technische Universität Berlin. After graduating from TU Berlin, Sass worked as a steam turbine designer at AEG from 1908. During World War I, Sass became the head of AEG's Diesel engine department, where he designed the double-acting piston two-stroke Diesel engine with air-blast-less, direct fuel injection; initially, it was intended for submarine use. In the 1920s, Sass continued his work on direct fuel injection systems; he was the first engineer to study the relation between the diameter of a fuel spray at the point of injection, and its cylinder intrusion. In 1940, Sass stopped working for AEG.

From 1927, Sass had been an untenured professor at TU Berlin, where he gave a lecture on direct-injected diesel engines. In 1946, he became a tenured professor for diesel engine design; on 31 March 1953, he was given emeritus status. From 1935 until 1952, Sass was a member of Germanischer Lloyd's board of directors.

On 2 April 1935, Sass obtained a patent on "Regulation means for internal combustion engines with injection without air and variable speed" US 1996710 that he had filed on 28 August 1929; it has four claims.

In 1949, Friedrich Sass founded the scientific journal "Konstruktion", of which he was the editor until 1963. In 1962, Springer published Sass's work "Geschichte des deutschen Verbrennungsmotorenbaus von 1860 bis 1918", which is considered the most important scientific work on the history of the internal combustion engine.

== Works ==
- Friedrich Sass, Charles Bouche: Dubbel: Taschenbuch für den Maschinenbau 11th edition, Springer, Berlin 1953, ISBN 978-3-662-41642-6
- Friedrich Sass, Charles Bouche: Dubbel: Taschenbuch für den Maschinenbau 12th edition, Springer, Berlin 1963, ISBN 978-3-662-38089-5
- Friedrich Sass: Bau und Betrieb von Dieselmaschinen: Ein Lehrbuch für Studierende. Erster Band: Grundlagen und Maschinenelemente, 2nd edition, Springer, Berlin/Heidelberg 1948, ISBN 978-3-662-00419-7
- Friedrich Sass: Bau und Betrieb von Dieselmaschinen Ein Lehrbuch für Studierende: Zweiter Band: Die Maschinen und Ihr Betrieb, 2nd edition, Springer, Berlin/Heidelberg 1957, ISBN 978-3-662-01637-4
- Friedrich Sass: Geschichte des deutschen Verbrennungsmotorenbaus von 1860 bis 1918, Springer, Berlin/Heidelberg 1962, ISBN 978-3-662-11843-6
