= Moritz Schröter =

German engineer

Rector of the Technical University of Munich
- In office 1908–1911
- Preceded by: Friedrich von Thiersch
- Succeeded by: Siegmund Günther

Personal details
- Born: 25 February 1851
- Died: 12 March 1925 (aged 74)
- Scientific career
- Fields: Mechanical engineering

Maximilian Moritz Schröter (25 February 1851 – 12 March 1925) was a German industrial engineer and university professor of thermodynamics and the theory of machines.

== Life and career ==
Moritz Schröter was the son of Moritz Schröter, who himself was a university professor. After his father′s death in 1867, Gustav Zeuner became the guardian of 16-year-old Schröter. After finishing the Gymnasium in Zürich, Schröter studied at the Polytechnikum Zürich, where he was awarded a diploma in engineering. From 1873 to 1876 he worked in the locomotive factory Georg Sigl in Wiener Neustadt. He then returned to Zürich, to become the university assistant of Georg Veith. In 1879, Schröter became a professor of theory of machines at the Technical University of Munich, where he built a new laboratory for machine design. From 1908 to 1911, he was the university's rector. Schröter helped designing four important machines in engineering history: the refrigerator (1887), the steam superheater (1894/1895), the Diesel engine (1897), and the steam turbine (1900).

== Bibliography ==
- Hans Christoph Graf von Seherr-Thoß: Schröter, Moritz. In: Neue Deutsche Biographie (NDB). Issue 23, Duncker & Humblot, Berlin 2007 ISBN 978-3-428-11204-3, pp. 587
