= Rudolf Diesel =

German inventor and engineer (1858–1913)

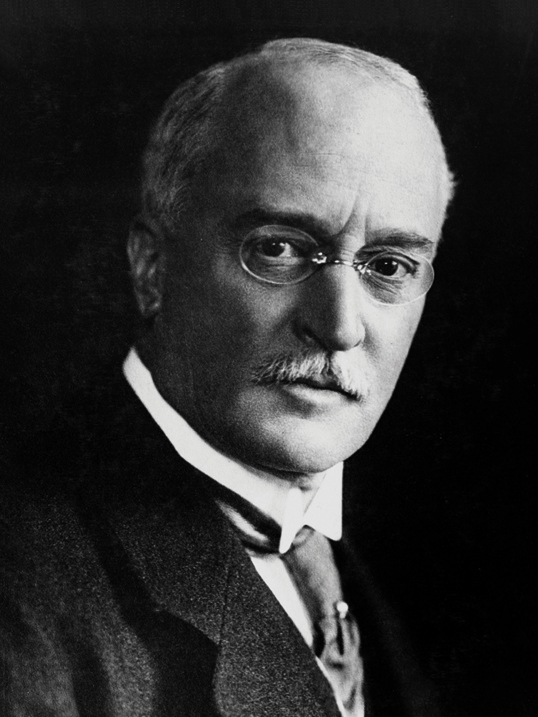
- Diesel, c. 1900
- Born: Rudolf Christian Karl Diesel; 18 March 1858; Paris, France
- Died: 29 September 1913 (aged 55); English Channel
- Resting place: North Sea
- Other name: Oscar Lintz
- Citizenship: German (Note: Until 1913, German citizenship was acquired through citizenship in a constituent state (whose requirements varied); from 1913, uniform citizenship requirements were set at the national level. As Diesel was born to parents from the Kingdom of Bavaria, he held Bavarian (and thus German) citizenship; in his US patent application (No. 608,845) from the 1890s, Diesel stated: "Be it known that I, Rudolf Diesel, a subject of the King of Bavaria, and a resident of Berlin, in the Kingdom of Prussia, Germany...".)
- Education: Technical University of Munich
- Occupations: Engineer; inventor; entrepreneur
- Known for: Diesel engine Diesel fuel
- Notable work: Motor 250/400
- Spouse: Martha Flasche (m. 1883)
- Children: 3
- Awards: Elliott Cresson Medal (1901)
- Engineering career
- Discipline: Mechanical engineering
- Employers: Sulzer; Linde; MAN AG; Krupp
- Significant advance: Internal combustion engine

Rudolf Christian Karl Diesel (English: /ˈdiːzəl, -səl/, German: [ˈʁuːdɔlf ˈkʀɪsti̯an kaʁl ˈdiːzl̩]; 18 March 1858 – 29 September 1913) was a German inventor and mechanical engineer. He is best known for inventing the diesel engine, which burns diesel fuel. Both are named for him.

== Early life and education ==
Diesel was born on 18 March 1858 at 38 Rue Notre-Dame-de-Nazareth in Paris, France, the second of three children of Elise (née Strobel) and Theodor Diesel. His parents were Bavarian immigrants living in Paris. Theodor Diesel, a bookbinder by trade, left his hometown of Augsburg, Bavaria, in 1848. He met his wife, a daughter of a Nuremberg merchant, in Paris in 1855 and became a leather goods manufacturer there.

Shortly after his birth, Diesel was given away to a Vincennes farmer family, where he spent his first nine months. When he was returned to his family, they moved into a flat at 49 Rue de la Fontaine-au-Roi. At the time, the Diesel family suffered from financial difficulties, thus young Rudolf Diesel had to work in his father's workshop and deliver leather goods to customers using a barrow. He attended a Protestant-French school and soon became interested in social questions and technology. Being a very good student, 12-year-old Diesel received the Société pour l'Instruction Elémentaire bronze medal and had plans to enter Ecole Primaire Supérieure in 1870.

At the outbreak of the Franco-Prussian War the same year, his family were deported to England, settling in London, where Diesel attended an English-speaking school. Before the war's end, however, Diesel's mother sent 12-year-old Rudolf to Augsburg to live with his aunt and uncle, Barbara and Christoph Barnickel, to become fluent in German and to visit the Königliche Kreis-Gewerbeschule (Royal County Vocational College), where his uncle taught mathematics. He was enrolled at the Technische Hochschule (Technical High School).

At the age of 14, Diesel wrote a letter to his parents saying that he intended to become an engineer. After finishing his basic education at the top of his class in 1873, he enrolled at the newly founded Industrial School of Augsburg. Two years later, he received a merit scholarship from the Royal Bavarian Polytechnic of Munich, which he accepted against the wishes of his parents, who wanted him to begin working instead.

== Career ==
One of Diesel's professors in Munich was the engineer and businessman Carl von Linde. Diesel was unable to graduate with his class in July 1879 because he fell ill with typhoid fever. While waiting for the next examination date, he gained practical engineering experience at the Sulzer Brothers Machine Works in Winterthur, Switzerland. Diesel graduated in January 1880 with highest academic honours and returned to Paris, where he assisted Linde with the design and construction of a modern refrigeration and ice plant. Diesel became the director of the plant a year afterwards.

In 1883, Diesel married Martha Flasche and continued to work for Linde, gaining numerous patents in both Germany and France.

In early 1890, Diesel moved to Berlin with his wife and children, Rudolf Jr, Heddy, and Eugen, to assume management of Linde's corporate research and development department and to join several other corporate boards. Since he was not allowed to use for his own purposes the patents he developed while an employee of Linde's, he expanded beyond the field of refrigeration. He first worked with steam, his research into thermal efficiency and fuel efficiency leading him to build a steam engine using ammonia vapor. During tests, however, the engine exploded and almost killed him. His research into high-compression cylinder pressures tested the strength of iron and steel cylinder heads. One exploded during a test run. He spent many months in a hospital, followed by health and eyesight problems. It was during this year that Diesel began conceptualising the idea of a diesel engine.

Ever since attending lectures of von Linde, Diesel worked on designing an internal combustion engine that could approach the maximum theoretical thermal efficiency of the Carnot cycle. In 1892, after working on this idea for several years, he considered his theory to be completed. In the same year, Diesel was given the German patent DRP 67207. In 1893, he published a treatise entitled Theory and Construction of a Rational Heat-engine to Replace the Steam Engine and The Combustion Engines Known Today, which he had been working on since early 1892. This treatise formed the basis for his work on and development of the diesel engine. By summer 1893, Diesel had realised that his initial theory was erroneous, leading him to file another patent application for the corrected theory in 1893.

Diesel understood thermodynamics and the theoretical and practical constraints on fuel efficiency. He knew that as much as 90% of the energy available in the fuel is wasted in a steam engine. His work in engine design was driven by the goal of much higher efficiency ratios.

As opposed to outside ignition applied against internal air and fuel mixture, air was compressed internally within the cylinder whilst heating. Fuel was injected at the end of the compression stroke and was ignited by the high temperature resulting from the compression, with no need for a spark plug. Therefore, the engine was smaller and weighed less than most contemporary steam engines, not to mention the fact that further fuel sources weren't required. Fuel efficiency was measured 75% above the 10% theoretical efficiency for steam engines.

From 1893 to 1897, Heinrich von Buz, director of Maschinenfabrik Augsburg in Augsburg, provided Rudolf Diesel the opportunity to test and develop his ideas. Diesel also received support from the Krupp firm.

The first successful diesel engine Motor 250/400 was officially tested in 1897, featuring a 25 horsepower four-stroke, single vertical cylinder compression. Having just revolutionised the engine manufacturing industry, it became an immediate success, with royalties amassing great wealth for Diesel. The engine is currently on display at the German Technical Museum in Munich.

Besides Germany, Diesel obtained patents for his design in other countries, including the United States (1895,1898).

The primary fuel used in Diesel engines today is the eponymous diesel fuel, derived from crude oil. While developing his engine, Diesel tested a wide range of liquid fuels, primarily coal distillates and petroleum products. Diesel also considered using coal dust, and he demonstrated vegetable oil as fuel. In a book titled Diesel Engines for Land and Marine Work, Diesel wrote:

In 1900 a small Diesel engine was exhibited by the Otto company which, on the suggestion of the French Government, was run on arachide [peanut] oil, and operated so well that very few people were aware of the fact. The motor was built for ordinary oils, and without any modification was run on vegetable oil. I have recently repeated these experiments on a large scale with full success and entire confirmation of the results formerly obtained.

== Disappearance and death ==
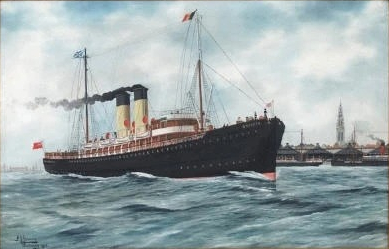
Dresden in Antwerp Harbour, 1913

On the evening of 29 September 1913, Diesel boarded the Great Eastern Railway steamer SS Dresden in Antwerp on his way to a meeting of the Consolidated Diesel Manufacturing company in London. He took dinner on board the ship and then retired to his cabin at about 10 p.m., leaving word to be called the next morning at 6:15 a.m., but he was never seen alive again. In the morning his cabin was empty and his bed had not been slept in, although his nightshirt was neatly laid out and his watch had been left where it could be seen from the bed. His hat and neatly folded overcoat were discovered beneath the afterdeck railing.

Shortly after Diesel's disappearance, his wife Martha opened a bag that her husband had given to her just before his ill-fated voyage, with directions that it should not be opened until the following week. She discovered 20,000 German marks in cash (US$120,000 today) and financial statements indicating that their bank accounts were virtually empty. In a diary Diesel brought with him on the ship, for the date 29 September 1913, a cross was drawn, possibly indicating death.

Ten days after he was last seen, the crew of the Dutch pilot boat Coertsen came upon the corpse of a man floating in the Eastern Scheldt. The body was in such an advanced state of decomposition that it was unrecognisable, and they did not retain it aboard because of heavy weather. Instead, the crew retrieved personal items (pill case, wallet, I.D. card, pocketknife, eyeglass case) from the clothing of the dead man, and returned the body to the sea. On 13 October, these items were identified by Rudolf's son, Eugen Diesel, as belonging to his father. Five months later, in March 1914, a rumor emerged that Diesel was in Canada and his wife, Martha, seemed to go missing in Germany. Martha ultimately died in Brandenburg on 16 April 1944, at age 85.

There are various theories to explain Diesel's death. Some, such as Diesel's biographers Grosser (1978) and Sittauer (1978) have argued that he died by suicide. Another line of thought suggests that he was murdered, given his refusal to grant the German forces the exclusive rights to using his invention; indeed, Diesel had boarded Dresden with the intent of meeting with representatives of the Royal Navy to discuss the possibility of powering British submarines by diesel engine. Another theory is that his apparent death was a ruse staged by the British government to cover his defection to the British cause, and that he then went to Canada, worked for the Vickers shipyard in Montreal and was responsible for a sudden acceleration in its ability to produce a successful Diesel engine for submarines. Given the limited evidence at hand, his disappearance and death remain unsolved.

In 1950, Magokichi Yamaoka, the founder of Yanmar, the diesel engine manufacturer in Japan, visited West Germany and learned that there was no tomb or monument for Diesel. Yamaoka and people associated with Diesel began to make preparations to honour him. In 1957, on the occasion of the 100th anniversary of Diesel's birth and the 60th anniversary of the diesel engine development, Yamaoka dedicated the Rudolf Diesel Memorial Garden (Rudolf-Diesel-Gedächtnishain) in Wittelsbacher Park in Augsburg, Bavaria, where Diesel had undertaken his early technical education and original engine development.

== Later development of the Diesel engine ==
After Diesel's death, his engine underwent much development and became a very important replacement for the steam piston engine.

Diesel engines use a higher compression ratio than gasoline engines, leading to higher pressures during combustion in the engine cylinder and a long expansion stroke. That combination gives Diesel engines high thermal efficiency. The Diesel engine became widespread in applications such as stationary engines, agricultural machines and off-highway machinery in general, submarines, ships, and much later, locomotives, trucks, and in modern automobiles. However, the high compression ratios of the Diesel engine required a heavier construction than a gasoline engine, and so it found limited use in aviation.

== Honors and recognition ==
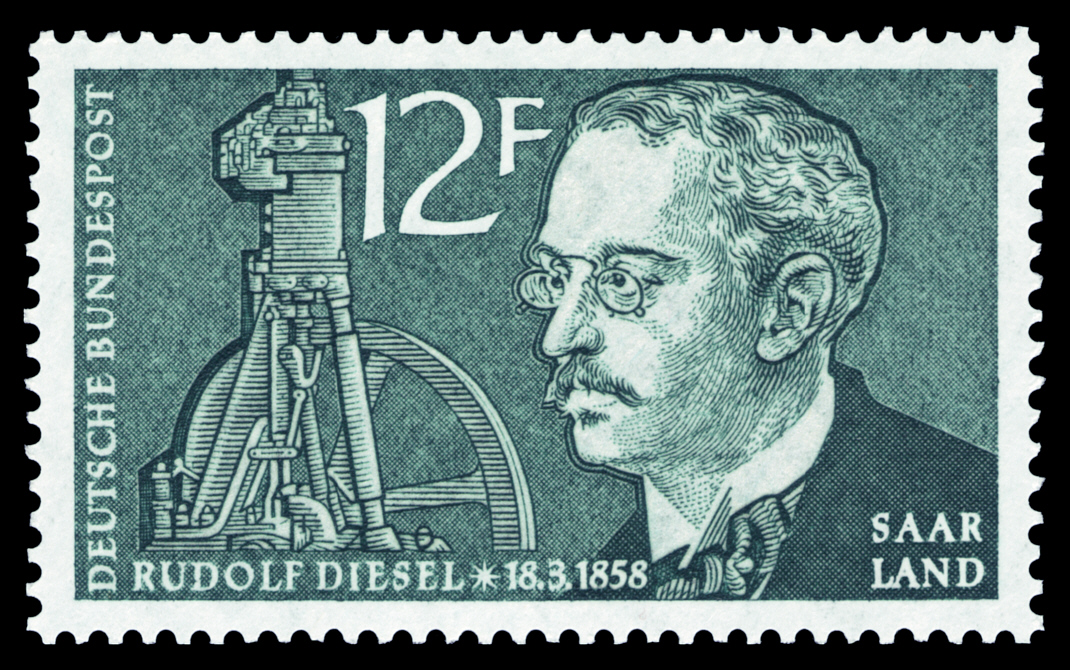
Rudolf Diesel on a 1958 German postage stamp

Diesel was elected an honorary member of the American Society of Mechanical Engineers in 1912.

In 1953, the German Institute for Inventions (Deutsches Institut für Erfindungswesen) created the Rudolf-Diesel-Medaille to recognize inventions and the entrepreneurship.

Since 1955, the VdM diesel ring has been awarded annually by the Association of Motor Journalists to recognize contributions to motor vehicle safety.

Diesel was inducted into the National Inventors Hall of Fame in 1976 and into the Automotive Hall of Fame in 1978.

The asteroid 10093 Diesel in the main asteroid belt, discovered in 1990 by Eric Walter Elst at the European Southern Observatory, was named in his honor.

== See also ==
- History of the internal combustion engine
- List of German inventors and discoverers
- List of people who disappeared mysteriously at sea
- List of unsolved deaths

== Works ==
- Rudolf Diesel: Theorie und Konstruktion eines rationellen Wärmemotors zum Ersatz der Dampfmaschine und der heute bekannten Verbrennungsmotoren. Springer, Berlin, 1893, ISBN 978-3-642-64949-3 (Theorie und Konstruktion eines rationellen Wärmemotors at Google Books)
- Rudolf Diesel: Die Entstehung des Dieselmotors. Springer, Berlin 1913. ISBN 978-3-642-64940-0
- Rudolf Diesel: Solidarismus: Natürliche wirtschaftliche Erlösung des Menschen, Oldenbourg, Berlin/München 1903. (PDF)

== Bibliography ==
- Cummins., C. Lyle Jr. (1993), Diesel's Engine: Volume 1: From Conception To 1918, Wilsonville, OR: Carnot Press, ISBN 978-0-917308-03-1. (C. Lyle Cummins, Jr. was the son of Clessie Cummins, founder of Cummins).
- Grosser, Morton (1978), Diesel: The Man and the Engine, New York: Atheneum, ISBN 978-0-689-30652-5, LCCN 78006196
- Moon, John F. (1974), Rudolf Diesel and the Diesel Engine, London: Priory Press, ISBN 978-0-85078-130-4, LCCN 74182524
- Sittauer, Hans L. (1990), Biographien hervorragender Naturwissenschaftler, Techniker und Mediziner, issue 32: Nicolaus August Otto Rudolf Diesel (4th edition), Leipzig, DDR: Springer (BSB Teubner), ISBN 978-3-322-00762-9
- Brunt, Douglas (2023), The Mysterious Case of Rudolf Diesel, United States: Atria Books, a division of Simon & Schuster, ISBN 978-1982169909
