= Diesel engine runaway =

Mechanical issue caused by fuel released from an unintended source

Diesel engine runaway is an occurrence in diesel engines, in which the engine draws excessive fuel from an unintended source and overspeeds at higher RPM, resulting in a catastrophic mechanical failure due to a lack of lubrication. Hot-bulb engines and jet engines can also experience runaway failures via the same process.

== Causes ==
In a diesel engine, the torque and the rotational speed are controlled by means of quality torque manipulation. This means that, with each intake stroke, the engine draws in air which is not mixed with fuel; the fuel is injected into the cylinder after its contents have been compressed during the compression stroke. The high air temperature near the end of the compression stroke causes spontaneous combustion of the mixture as the fuel is injected. The output torque is controlled by adjusting the mass of injected fuel; the more fuel injected, the higher the torque produced. Adjusting the amount of fuel received per stroke alters the quality of the air-fuel-mixture, and adjusting the amount of the mixture itself is not required, negating the need for a throttle valve.

Diesel engines can combust a large variety of fuels, including many sorts of oil, petrol, and combustible gases. This means that if there is any type of leak or malfunction that increases the amount of oil or fuel unintentionally entering the combustion chamber, the quality of the air-fuel-mixture will increase, causing torque and rotational speed to increase.

Fuel and oil leaks causing engine runaways can have both internal and external causes. Broken seals or a broken turbocharger may cause large amounts of oil mist to enter the inlet manifold, whereas defective injection pumps may cause an unintentionally large amount of fuel to be injected directly into the combustion chamber. If a diesel engine is operated in an environment where combustible gases are used, a gas leak may result in an engine runaway if the gas can enter the engine's inlet manifold.

== Stopping a runaway engine ==
Runaway diesel engines can be stopped by restricting the air supply to the engine, either physically using a cover or plug, or alternatively by directing a CO_{2} fire extinguisher into the air intake. Engines fitted with a decompressor can also be stopped by operating the decompressor, and in a vehicle with a manual transmission it is sometimes possible to stop the engine by engaging a high gear (i.e. 4th, 5th, 6th, 7th, 8th, 9th, 10th, etc.), with foot brake and parking brake fully applied, and quickly letting out the clutch to slow the engine RPM to a stop, without moving the vehicle. This should be the last option because it can result in catastrophic damage to the whole transmission, mainly the gearbox, but this operation can save the engine.

== Notable incidents involving diesel engine runaway ==
In the 2005 Texas City refinery explosion, an instance of diesel engine runaway is thought to have provided the ignition source that triggered the massive explosion. After the refinery's blowdown stack malfunctioned and started releasing a cloud of raffinate vapor into the air, a pickup truck that had been parked near the stack with its engine idling was engulfed by the vapor cloud released and the engine started to feed on it, enter a runaway state, and generate excessive heat. As staff at the refinery attempted to stop the truck's now-overheating engine, it backfired, igniting the vapor cloud and triggering the disaster.

== Bibliography ==
- Seifert, Bill; William G. Seifert; Daniel Spurr (2001). Offshore Sailing: 200 Essential Passagemaking Tips. McGraw-Hill Professional. ISBN 0-07-137424-8.

== See also ==
- Dieseling
- Rev limiter
