= Inverse consequences =

Unintended outcomes opposite to intended effects

The term "inverse consequences" or the "Law of Inverse Consequences" refers to results that are the opposite of the expected results as initially intended or planned. One consequence is in the "reverse predicament" of the other.

== History ==
The term "inverse consequences" has been in use for over 175 years (since at least 1835). The term was also used by Auguste Comte (1798–1857) in his book System of Positive Polity (published 1875), stating, "Inevitable increase in Complication, in proportion with the decrease of Generality, gives rise to two inverse consequences."

== Documented examples ==
The term "inverse consequences" has been applied in numerous situations, for example:

- In treatment of drug addiction, medications intended to reduce one type of addiction might trigger another addiction: long-term treatment with opiate medications (such as morphine) has inverse consequences.
- In management of work tasks, a total sequential execution, of work tasks, has inverse consequences, such as a decrease of the workload with an increase of the lead time.
- In asset management, plans for portfolio management might have inverse consequences to the potential benefits.

== Related phrases ==
The concept of "inverse consequences" has a corollary in other phrases, as well:

- "the plan backfired" - meaning the opposite result occurred, as in a gun firing backward, rather than forward.

== See also ==
- Invasive species
- Regression testing
