= MWM AKD 112 Z =

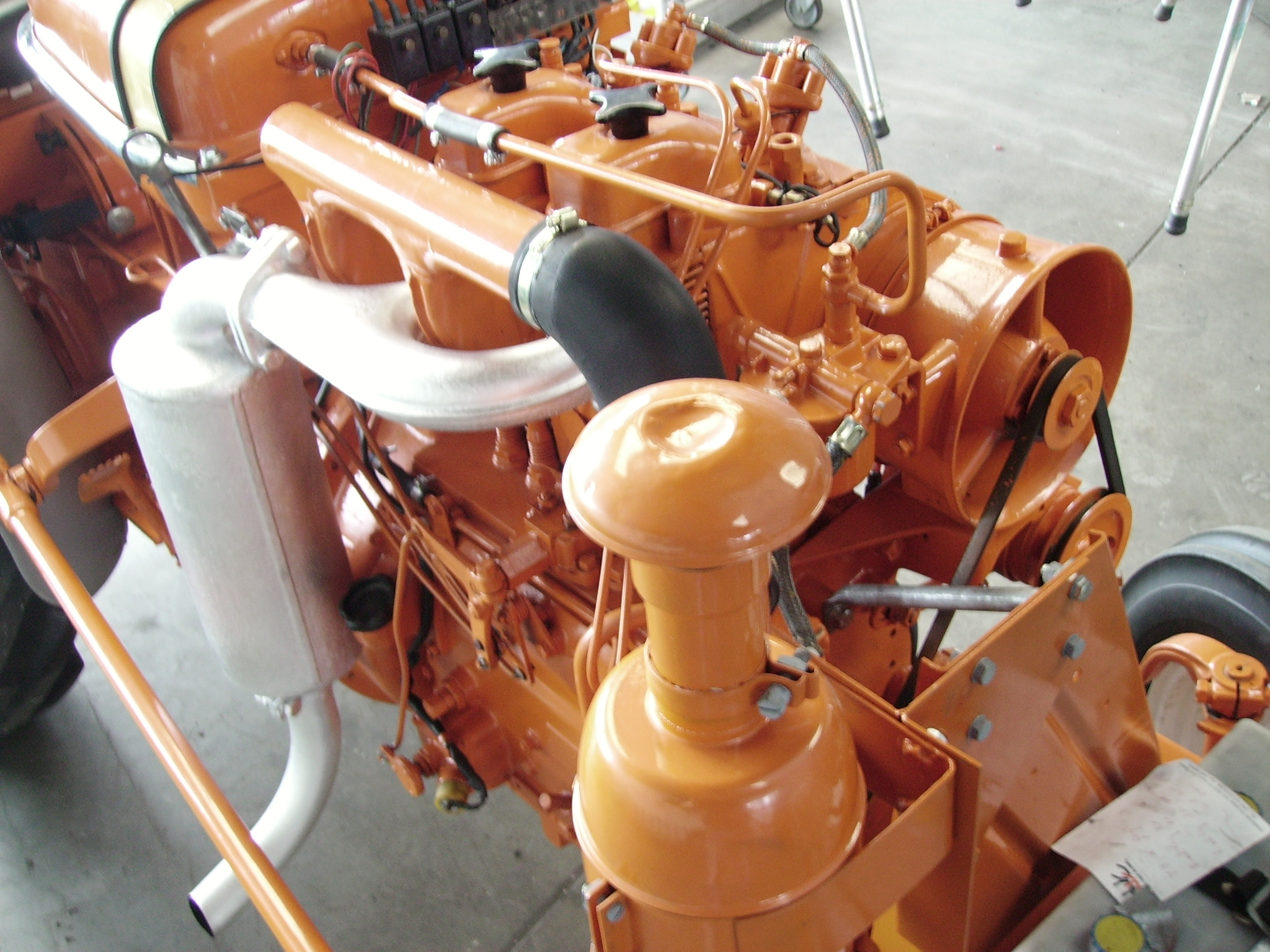

Overview
- Manufacturer: Motorenwerke Mannheim
- Production: 1955–1960

Layout
- Configuration: Straight-2
- Displacement: 1810 cm³
- Cylinder bore: 98 mm
- Piston stroke: 120 mm
- Valvetrain: OHV

Combustion
- Operating principle: Diesel
- Fuel system: Direct injection
- Fuel type: Diesel oil 45< CN, (Petroleum, Gas oil, Kerosine, Paraffin)
- Cooling system: Air-cooled

Output
- Power output: 16.2 kW at 2000 min^{−1} (DIN 70020)
- Specific power: 9 kW·dm^{−3}
- Torque output: 89.2 Nm at 1500 min^{−1}

Chronology
- Predecessor: MWM AKD 12 Z
- Successor: None

The MWM AKD 112 Z is an air-cooled two-cylinder inline diesel engine produced by MWM from 1955 – 1960. One, three and four cylinder variants of the same engine family were also produced by MWM.

== Description ==
The AKD 112 Z is an air-cooled, two-cylinder, four stroke diesel engine with overhead valves. The letter Z means Zweizylinder, German for two cylinders.

The crankcase is a single cast piece, the drop-forged crankshaft with screwed on counter weights is supported in bearings made of steel-lead-bronze. The crank and shaft pins of the crankshaft are heat-hardened. Due to the air-cooling of the engine, the cylinders have cooling fins made of centrifugal cast metal. The combustion chamber of the engine is a part of the piston bowls, as the engine is direct-injected. The pistons are made of a special highly heat resistant light metal alloy, they have three piston rings and one oil control ring. The bigger conrod eyes are made of steel-lead-bronze, the upper smaller conrod eyes are made of special-bronze. The camshaft is supported by rolling bearings. The overhead valves are actuated by rockers and pushrods. The cylinder head is a single piece made of a chill cast, highly heat resistant light metal alloy. The engine's air filter is a wire-gauze type air filter. For dusty environments MWM offered an oilbath air filter. The air intake must not draw in hot air; this would reduce the engine's power output. The engine has a Bosch injection pump. It is controlled by a centrifugal control mechanism using a pushrod. The control trap makes it possible to change the injection time at the engine start-up to pump more fuel into the cylinder. A forced feed (wet sump) lubrication system lubricates the engine, powered by a gear oil pump. The oil is filtered by a strainer in the low pressure circuit, and a fine sieve strainer in the high pressure circuit. A gap filter in the high pressure circuit was also available. Being air-cooled, the AKD 112 Z has an axial cooling fan powered by the crankshaft using a belt. The power can be taken off the flywheel or the PTO-shaft. An electric motor can be used to start the engine, but a crank starting is standard. The AKD 112 Z has a decompression starting aid system. Being direct-injected, it does not have glowplugs.

MWM AKD 112 Z in a Wesseler WL24, 1955

	AKD 112 Z
Production period	1955 – 1960
Engine configuration	Straight two-cylinder four-stroke diesel engine
Valvetrain	Overhead valves, actuated by pushrods and rocker arms
Bore × Stroke, Displacement	98 × 120 mm 1810 cm³
Maximum power output at 2000 min^{−1}	24 PS (17.7 kW)
Rated power output at 2000 min^{−1}	22 PS (16.2 kW)
Maximum torque at 1500 min^{−1}	9.1 kp⋅m (89.2 N⋅m)
Specific fuel consumption at highest torque	251.2 g/kWh ±10 %
