= Back-fire =

Explosion in the exhaust of an engine

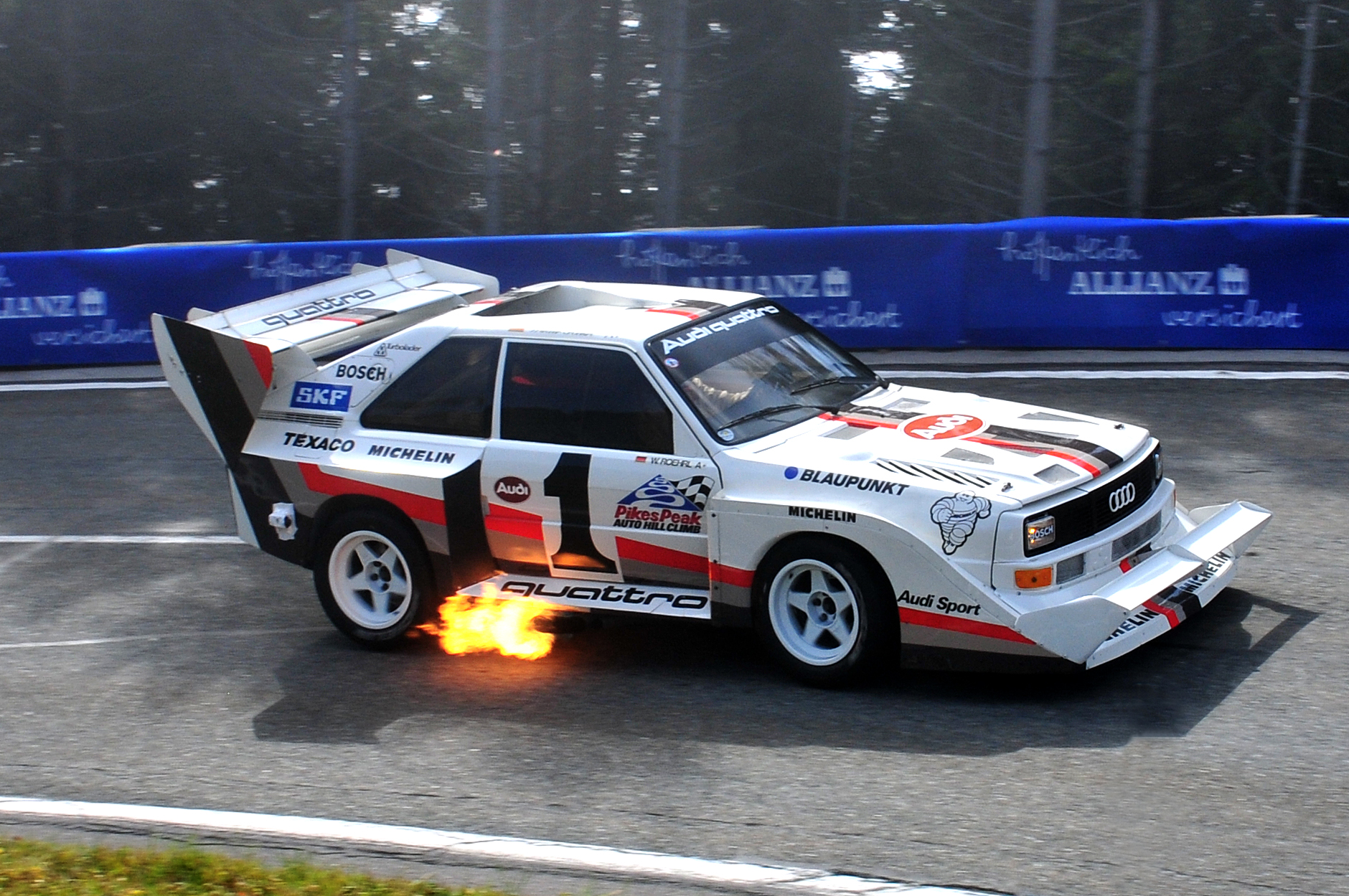
Flames bursting from the exhaust pipe of an Audi Sport Quattro S1 E2 Pikes Peak

A backfire or afterburn is combustion or an explosion produced by a running internal combustion engine that occurs in the exhaust system, rather than inside the combustion chamber. It is also sometimes referred to as an afterfire, especially in cases where the word backfire is used to mean a fuel burn that occurs while an intake valve is open, causing the fire to move backward through the system and out through the intake instead of the exhaust. When the flame moves backward it may also be called a "pop-back". A backfire can be caused either by ignition that happens with an exhaust valve open or unburnt fuel making its way into the hot exhaust system. A visible flame may momentarily shoot out of the exhaust pipe. A backfire is often a sign that the engine is improperly tuned.

The term derives from parallel experiences with early unreliable firearms or ammunition in which the explosive force was directed out at the breech instead of the muzzle. This is also the origin of the use of "backfire" to indicate producing an unintended, unexpected, and undesired result.

== Explanation ==
Common causes of backfire are running rich (too much fuel going into cylinders) or faulty ignition, possibly a fouled (dirty) spark plug, coil, or plug wire.

Pop-backs are usually caused by problems with timing. If the timing is too early, the spark plug fires before the intake valves close, causing the combustion to propagate into the intake manifold, further igniting the air-fuel mixture there; the resulting explosion then travels out of the carburetor and air filter. On many small marine engines, a screen is placed over the intake of the carburetor as a flame arrestor, to prevent these flames from escaping the intake and potentially igniting fuel or fuel vapors in the enclosed sump or bilge of the boat, causing a fire or explosion. Alternatively, the ignition timing may be late, in which case the combustion is not completed by the time the exhaust valves open, allowing the combustion to propagate into the exhaust system.

Additionally, improperly adjusted carburetors that create a lean condition during acceleration can cause the air–fuel mixture to burn so slowly that combustion is still taking place during the exhaust stroke, and even when the intake valve opens. The flame front can then travel up the intake and cause a popback. In this situation it is conceivable that there is a popback occurring in the intake manifold and exhaust manifold simultaneously.

In both cases (combustion occurring before and after the combustion chamber), the result is a sharp pop, which is colloquially referred to as a "backfire". However, for troubleshooting, engine mechanics more strictly define an ignition of fuel within the engine exhaust system as a "backfire", while a "popback" is this same process taking place in the induction system.

== Causes ==
Exhaust system backfires occur in engines that have an emission system malfunction, like an air injection system diverter valve problem, an exhaust leak, or when the catalytic converter has been removed. In some high-performance vehicles, when a driver shifts up and lets off the accelerator, the engine has a moment of running rich. This causes an incomplete burn which causes the fumes to explode in the exhaust system along with an audible pop or bang sound. This is a result of working equipment, and is unlikely to cause damage.

A fuel-injected engine may backfire if an intake leak is present (causing the engine to run lean), or a fuel injection component such as an air-flow sensor is defective.

Common causes of backfires are:

- Wankel rotary engines are known for leaking oil into the exhaust system which causes backfire.
- Poor or unregulated engine timing is often a cause of intake backfires, but can also be responsible for exhaust backfires. Backfires and loud explosion-like sounds are common when an antilag system is present and active.
- Improper wiring in the ignition can also lead to timing issues and backfires.
- Low fuel pressure, clogged fuel filters, and weak fuel pumps could cause a severely lean air-to-fuel ratio during the fuel injection process.
- A missing or damaged catalytic converter can result in backfires out the tailpipe.
- Broken exhaust-system piping, especially if located immediately downstream of the exhaust manifold, can result in backfiring underneath the vehicle.

== Applications ==
With older engine designs, backfiring can be common or unavoidable. Backfire is rare in modern vehicles with fuel injection and computer-controlled fuel mixtures.

Cars with sports exhausts (both factory-fitted and aftermarket) are much more likely to backfire. In some circumstances the backfire is seen as an additional perk of the car. The TVR Cerbera is an example of a car with factory-fitted sports exhausts which produce frequent backfires on engine braking.

In high-powered supercharged aircraft piston engines such as the Rolls-Royce Merlin and Griffon, backfiring into the inlet manifold is prevented with flame traps inside the manifold, the traps preventing the flame propagating into the compressed air/fuel mixture within the manifold.

== See also ==
- Dieseling, an after-run condition in which an engine continues to run without the spark plugs firing
