= Dieseling =

Engine condition

Dieseling or engine run-on is a condition that can occur in spark-plug-ignited, gasoline-powered internal combustion engines, whereby the engine keeps running for a short period after being turned off, drawing fuel through the carburetor, into the engine and igniting it without a spark.

Dieseling is so named because it is similar in effect to how diesel engines operate: by firing without a spark. The ignition source of a diesel engine is the heat generated by the compression of the air in the cylinder, rather than a spark as in gasoline engines. The dieseling phenomenon occurs not just because the compression ratio is sufficient to cause auto-ignition of the fuel, but also because a hot spot inside the cylinder (spark plug electrode, combustion-chamber/valve edge or even excess carbon) starts combustion. An automobile engine that is dieseling will typically sputter, then gradually stop. This is normally seen in carbureted engines with many miles on them.

Dieseling is not nearly as common as it once was, because it most commonly occurs in engines equipped with carburetors. The vast majority of vehicles manufactured after 1987 are fuel-injected: the injectors and high-pressure fuel pump immediately cease supplying fuel to the cylinders when the ignition is switched off. If the injector is damaged or dirty, a small amount of fuel can enter the chamber and be ignited, causing a sputter or two after the engine is switched off.

Until the mass-market introduction of fuel injection, the industry's remedy for dieseling was to install an electric solenoid into the fuel supply circuit of the carburetor, energized by the ignition coil primary wire: when activated, the solenoid would open and allow fuel to flow normally out of the float bowl, through the fuel-metering jets and into the engine; when deactivated, the solenoid would close and prevent fuel from being drawn through the jets and into the engine. This provided a simple, adequate solution to the dieseling problem.

An alternative solution is a pipe which admits air into the intake manifold when a solenoid is de-energized. This allows intake air to bypass the carburetor, drawing in no fuel and greatly weakening the air-fuel mixture to the point where the engine cannot continue to run. This method was employed in the MG Metro 1300.

Dieseling (in the sense of engine run-on, and disregarding combustible gaseous mixtures via the air intake) can also occur in diesel engines, when the piston or seals fail due to overheating, admitting engine oil into the cylinder. A structurally failing diesel engine will often accelerate when the throttle is released, even after fuel injection is switched off.

Some carbureted engines have low-pressure fuel pumps: they are typically designed only to overcome a loss of suction in the fuel line near the engine due to fuel evaporation in hot weather, to supply sufficient fuel to maintain stoichiometric combustion under heavy load with wide-open throttle, or a combination of the two. Fuel demand is low at idle and there is more than enough manifold vacuum to draw sufficient fuel for combustion, even if the fuel pump is switched off.

Gasoline engines that are much smaller than the typical automotive engine are usually carbureted for economic and engineering reasons. Dieseling can occur in such engines. These engines include those installed in small generators, mopeds, scooters, small motorcycles, all-terrain vehicles, and most lawn and garden power tools.

== Potential causes ==
Dieseling can occur for several reasons:

- Built-up carbon in the ignition chamber can glow red after the engine is off, providing a mechanism for igniting unburnt fuel. Such a thing can happen when the engine runs very rich, depositing unspent fuel and particles on the pistons and valves. Similarly, rough metal regions within the piston chamber can cause this same problem, since they can glow red. It has also been suggested that an improperly rated spark plug can retain heat and cause the same problem.
- A carburetor that does not completely close can contribute to running once the engine is off, since the extra fuel and oxygen mixture can combust easily in the warm piston chamber. Similarly, hot vaporized oil gases from the engine crankcase can provide ample fuel for dieseling.
- Incorrect timing.
- An engine that runs too hot or too lean may produce an environment conducive to allowing unspent fuel to burn.
- An idle speed that is too fast can leave the engine with too much angular momentum upon shutdown, raising the chances that the engine can turn over and burn more fuel and lock itself into a cycle of continuous running.
- Another potential "run on" problem after an ignition has been turned off can be attributed to one or more inlet valves that are not sealing fully allowing the piston motion to pull a fuel mixture in when technically the valve is shut.

== In air rifles ==
The term is also used to refer to the deliberate or accidental burning of oils or similar flammable hydrocarbons with a similar effect as liquid propellant when an air rifle is discharged. A spring or ram-powered air rifle works by a piston rapidly compressing the air in the chamber behind the projectile forcing the projectile (usually a pellet) out at speed. Where the air contains flammable contaminants or additions, the temperature rise associated with the compression may ignite the mixture in a similar way to fuel in a diesel engine. This adds to the energy of the system, some of which is transferred to the pellet as increased velocity.

Owing to the relatively small muzzle energy of air rifles compared to the stored chemical energy in oil, dieseling can make a substantial difference to the velocity of the pellet. While generally an unwanted phenomenon due to the effect on accuracy and also potential damage to rifle or sight, it is sometimes deliberately engineered by oiling the rear hollow base of the pellet or chamber, in order to increase the power of the weapon. This is usually done as a stunt or in experimentation - the tiny amounts of oil involved makes consistency impractical, with consequent substantial adverse effect on accuracy.

== See also ==
- Diesel engine runaway
