= Beare-head engine =

The Beare-head engine internal combustion engine technology combines a four-stroke engine bottom end and piston, with a ported cylinder head closely resembling that of a two-stroke engine. The head piston is smaller and moves at half cycling of the bottom piston. Functionally, the cylinder-head piston replaces part of the valve mechanism of a conventional four-stroke engine, and protects the remainder from the higher pressures. This configuration has been described as a six-stroke engine based on adding together the four strokes per cycle of the bottom piston and the two strokes of the cylinder head piston, but there are essentially only 4 strokes, just with an alternative form of valving.
