= Five-stroke engine =

Conceptual engine

The five-stroke engine is a compound internal combustion engine patented by Gerhard Schmitz in 2000.

== Concept ==
The goal of the five-stroke engine is to achieve higher efficiency than a four-stroke engine. In order to increase efficiency, a secondary cylinder is added as an expansion processor to extract more energy from the fuel. Schmitz's concept engine uses two primary "high pressure" cylinders with standard four-stroke power cycles, in addition to a larger secondary "low pressure" expansion cylinder. The hot exhaust gas from the two primary cylinders is fed into the secondary cylinder, halving the volume of gases in the primary cylinders after combustion.

This concept is similar to that of compound steam engines, which expand steam in high pressure cylinders before exhausting it into low-pressure cylinders in order to extract more energy from the steam. In 1879, Nicolaus Otto built a 5-stroke engine which was commercially produced, but suffered from poor performance. Two Spanish patents (ES0156621, F Jimeno-Cataneo, 1942; and ES0433850, C Ubierna-Laciana, 1975) describe 5-stroke engines identical to that of Schmitz's design, this engine had a fellowship to Burgundy University to be studied. J.W. Eisenhuth patented an 'air and gas engine' with double expansion (US640890, 1900). A car with this engine was in the Harrah Collection, though its fate after the collection was dismantled is unknown.

In Schmitz's design, the compression ratio of the low pressure expansion cylinder is adjustable to achieve an optimal expansion ratio, regardless of the primary cylinders' compression ratio. The prototype has demonstrated an approximately 10% decrease in fuel consumption over a standard gas engine.

The operation of a 5-stroke SI engine is as follows:
1 – Induction
2 – Compression
3 – Power
4 – Initial exhaust/re-expansion
5 – Final exhaust

== Prototype ==
Schmitz's concept was being developed by Ilmor. Ilmor's prototype, intended for motorcycle use and consisting of 2 primary cylinders and 1 secondary cylinder, uses a solid cylinder block with electrically driven oil and water pumps, two overhead camshafts with standard poppet valves, and turbocharging. Its displacement is 700 cc (43 cu in) without the secondary cylinder and 1,478 cc (90.2 cu in) in total, and it can produce 130 hp (97 kW) at 7,000 rpm and 166 N⋅m (122 lb⋅ft) at 5,000 rpm.

== See also ==
- Rotary engine
- Stirling engine
- Stroke (engine)
  - Two- and four-stroke engines
  - Two-stroke engine
  - Four-stroke engine
  - Six-stroke engine
- Thermodynamic cycle
  - Atkinson cycle
  - Miller cycle
