= Stroke (engine) =

Phase of an engine piston's travel

In the context of an internal combustion engine, the term stroke has the following related meanings:

- A phase of the engine's cycle (e.g. compression stroke, exhaust stroke), during which the piston travels from top to bottom or vice versa.
- The type of power cycle used by a piston engine (e.g. two-stroke engine, four-stroke engine).
- "Stroke length", the distance travelled by the piston during each cycle. The stroke length, along with bore diameter, determines the engine's displacement.

== Phases in the power cycle ==
The phases/strokes of a four-stroke engine. 1: intake 2: compression 3: power 4: exhaust

Animation of a two-stroke engine

Commonly used engine phases or strokes (i.e. those used in a four-stroke engine) are described below. Other types of engines can have very different phases.

=== Induction-intake stroke ===
The induction stroke is the first phase in a four-stroke (e.g. Otto cycle or Diesel cycle) engine. It involves the downward movement of the piston, creating a partial vacuum that draws an air-fuel mixture (or air alone, in the case of a direct injection engine) into the combustion chamber. The mixture enters the cylinder through an intake valve at the top of the cylinder.

=== Compression stroke ===
The compression stroke is the second of the four stages in a four-stroke engine.

In this stage, the air-fuel mixture (or air alone, in the case of a direct injection engine) is compressed to the top of the cylinder by the piston. This is the result of the piston moving upwards, reducing the volume of the chamber. Towards the end of this phase, the mixture is ignited, by a spark plug for petrol engines or by self-ignition for diesel engines.

=== Combustion-power-expansion stroke ===
The combustion stroke is the third phase, where the ignited air-fuel mixture expands and pushes the piston downwards. The force created by this expansion is what creates an engine's power.

=== Exhaust stroke ===
The exhaust stroke is the final phase in a four stroke engine. In this phase, the piston moves upwards, squeezing out the gasses that were created during the combustion stroke. The gasses exit the cylinder through an exhaust valve at the top of the cylinder. At the end of this phase, the exhaust valve closes and the intake valve opens, which then closes to allow a fresh air-fuel mixture into the cylinder so the process can repeat itself.

== Types of power cycles ==
The thermodynamic cycle used by a piston engine is often described by the number of strokes to complete a cycle. The most common designs for engines are two-stroke and four-stroke. Less common designs include one-stroke engines, five-stroke engines, six-stroke engines and two-and-four stroke engines.

=== One-stroke engine ===
A Granada, Spain-based company, INNengine invented an opposed-piston engine with four pistons on either side to make a total of eight. Fixed rods hold together all pistons, and they share one combustion chamber. These rods press against plates that have an oscillating wave-like design, allowing the rods to press and release the pistons in a synchronized, smooth process. The engine, known as the e-REX creates 4 times more power events per revolution than a conventional 4 Stroke and twice more than a 2 Stroke. Although the e-REX is called a one-stroke engine there is debate that says it is actually a two-stroke engine, it is called a one-stroke because each piston executes two strokes (i.e., compression/combustion and exhaust/intake) in half an engine revolution, then by INNengine's logic, two strokes multiplied by half a revolution is what gave it the Patented 1 Stroke name.

=== Two-stroke engine ===
Two-stroke engines complete a power cycle every two strokes, which means a power cycle is completed with every crankshaft revolution. Two-stroke engines are commonly used in (typically large) marine engines, outdoor power tools (e.g. lawnmowers and chainsaws) and motorcycles.

=== Four-stroke engine ===
Four-stroke engines complete a power cycle every four strokes, which means a power cycle is completed every two crankshaft revolutions. Most automotive engines are of a four-stroke design.

=== Five-stroke engine ===
Five-stroke engines complete a power cycle every five strokes. The engine only exists as a prototype.

=== Six-stroke engine ===
Six-stroke engines complete a power cycle every six strokes, which means a power cycle is completed every three crankshaft revolutions.

== Stroke length ==
The stroke length is how far the piston travels in the cylinder, which is determined by the cranks on the crankshaft.

Engine displacement is calculated by multiplying the cross-section area of the cylinder (determined by the bore) by the stroke length. This number is multiplied by the number of cylinders in the engine, to determine the total displacement.

== Steam engine ==
The term stroke can also apply to movement of the piston in a locomotive cylinder.

== See also ==
- Stroke ratio
