= Six-stroke engine =

Internal combustion engine designs

A six-stroke engine is one of several alternative internal combustion engine designs that attempt to improve on traditional two-stroke and four-stroke engines. Claimed advantages may include increased fuel efficiency, reduced mechanical complexity, and/or reduced emissions. These engines can be divided into two groups based on the number of pistons that contribute to the six strokes.

In the single-piston designs, the engine captures the heat lost from the four-stroke Otto cycle or Diesel cycle and uses it to drive an additional power and exhaust stroke of the piston in the same cylinder in an attempt to improve fuel efficiency and assist with engine cooling. The pistons in this type of six-stroke engine go up and down three times for each injection of fuel. These designs use either steam or air as the working fluid for the additional power stroke.

The designs in which the six strokes are determined by the interactions between two pistons are more diverse. The pistons may be opposed in a single cylinder or may reside in separate cylinders. Usually, one cylinder makes two strokes while the other makes four strokes, giving six piston movements per cycle. The second piston may be used to replace the valve mechanism of a conventional engine, which may reduce mechanical complexity and enable an increased compression ratio by eliminating hotspots that would otherwise limit compression. The second piston may also be used to increase the expansion ratio, decoupling it from the compression ratio. Increasing the expansion ratio in this way can increase thermodynamic efficiency in a similar manner to the Miller or Atkinson cycle.

== Engine types ==
=== Single-piston designs ===
These designs use a single piston per cylinder, like a conventional two- or four-stroke engine. A secondary, nondetonating fluid is injected into the chamber, and the leftover heat from combustion causes it to expand for a second power stroke followed by a second exhaust stroke.

==== Griffin six-stroke engine ====
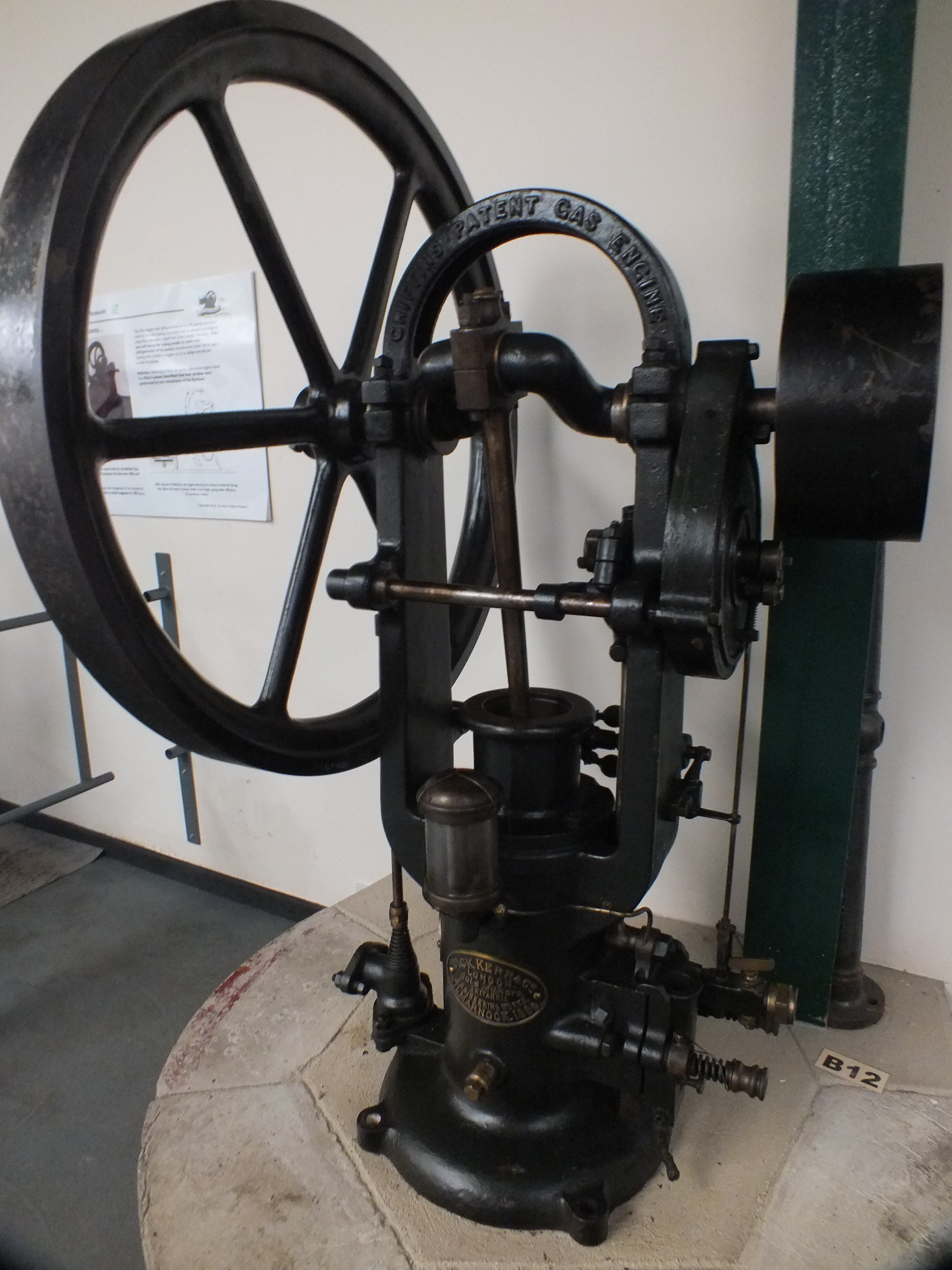
The Kerr engine at the Anson Engine Museum

In 1883, the Bath-based engineer Samuel Griffin was an established maker of steam and gas engines. He wished to produce an internal combustion engine, but without paying the licensing costs of the Otto patents. His solution was to develop a "patent slide valve" and a single-acting six-stroke engine using it. By 1886, Scottish steam locomotive maker Dick, Kerr & Co. saw a future in large oil engines and licensed the Griffin patents. These were double-acting, tandem engines and sold under the name "Kilmarnock". A major market for the Griffin engine was in electricity generation, where they developed a reputation for happily running light for long periods, then suddenly being able to take up a large demand for power. Their large, heavy construction did not suit them to mobile use, but they were capable of burning heavier and cheaper grades of oil. The key principle of the "Griffin Simplex" was a heated, exhaust-jacketed external vapouriser, into which the fuel was sprayed. The temperature was held around 550 °F (288 °C), sufficient to physically vapourise the oil, but not to break it down chemically. This fractional distillation supported the use of heavy oil fuels, the unusable tars and asphalts separating out in the vapouriser. Hot-bulb ignition was used, which Griffin termed the "catathermic igniter", a small isolated cavity connected to the combustion chamber. The spray injector had an adjustable inner nozzle for the air supply, surrounded by an annular casing for the oil, both oil and air entering at 20 psi (140 kPa) pressure, and being regulated by a governor. Griffin went out of business in 1923. Only two known examples of a Griffin six-stroke engine survive. One is in the Anson Engine Museum. The other was built in 1885 and for some years was in the Birmingham Museum of Science and Technology, but in 2007, it returned to Bath and the Museum of Bath at Work.

==== Dyer six-stroke engine ====
Leonard Dyer invented a six-stroke, internal combustion, water-injection engine in 1915, very similar to Crower's design (see below). A dozen more similar patents have been issued since.

Dyer's six-stroke engine features:

- No cooling system required
- Improves a typical engine's fuel consumption
- Requires a supply of pure water to act as the medium for the second power stroke.
- Extracts the additional power from the expansion of steam.

==== Bajulaz six-stroke engine ====
The Bajulaz six-stroke engine is similar to a regular combustion engine in design, but modifications were made to the cylinder head, with two supplementary fixed-capacity chambers: a combustion chamber and an air-preheating chamber above each cylinder. The combustion chamber receives a charge of heated air from the cylinder; the injection of fuel begins an isochoric (constant-volume) burn, which increases the thermal efficiency compared to a burn in the cylinder. The high pressure achieved is then released into the cylinder to work the power or expansion stroke. Meanwhile, a second chamber, which blankets the combustion chamber, has its air content heated to a high degree by heat passing through the cylinder wall. This heated and pressurized air is then used to power an additional stroke of the piston.

The claimed advantages of the engine include reduction in fuel consumption by at least 40%, two expansion strokes in six strokes, multiple-fuel usage capability, and a dramatic reduction in pollution.

The Bajulaz six-stroke engine was invented in 1989 by Roger Bajulaz of the Bajulaz S.A. company, based in Geneva, Switzerland; it has U.S. patent 4,809,511 and U.S. patent 4,513,568.

The Bajulaz six-stroke engine features claimed are:

- Reduction in fuel consumption by at least 40%
- Two expansion (work) strokes in six strokes
- Multifuel, including liquefied petroleum gas
- Dramatic reduction in air pollution
- Costs comparable to those of a four-stroke engine

==== Velozeta six-stroke engine ====
In a Velozeta engine, fresh air is injected into the cylinder during the exhaust stroke, which expands by heat and therefore forces the piston down for an additional stroke. The valve overlaps have been removed, and the two additional strokes using air injection provide for better gas scavenging. The engine seems to show 40% reduction in fuel consumption and dramatic reduction in air pollution. Its power-to-weight ratio is slightly less than that of a four-stroke gasoline engine. The engine can run on a variety of fuels, ranging from gasoline and diesel fuel to LPG. An altered engine shows a 65% reduction in carbon monoxide pollution when compared with the four-stroke engine from which it was developed. The engine was developed in 2005 by a team of mechanical engineering students, U Krishnaraj, Boby Sebastian, Arun Nair, and Aaron Joseph George of the College of Engineering, Trivandrum.

==== NIYKADO six-stroke engine ====
This engine was developed by Chanayil Cleetus Anil, of Cochin, India, who was granted an Indian patent for the design in 2012. The patent listing gives a filing date of 4 April 2005, a grant date of 25 May 2012, and records the patent's legal status as term expired. The name of the engine is taken from the name of his company, NIYKADO Motors. The engine underwent a preliminary round of full-throttle tests at the Automotive Research Association of India, Pune. The inventor claims this engine "is 23% more fuel efficient compared to a conventional four-stroke engine" and it is "very low on pollution".

Anil, a mechanic, developed the NIYKADO engine over the course of more than 15 years. The engine was first tested in 2004 and Anil applied for his patent in 2005. He claims that his design produces drastically less pollution and that use in the automotive industry could lead to "emission-less mobility". The patent description states that the engine specification includes both a two-valve system and a four-valve system; in the two-valve system, a buffer stroke and a retake stroke are added between the power and exhaust strokes.

Niykado Technologies Private Limited was later incorporated in Kerala in 2022. Kerala Startup Mission lists the company as a certified startup with Anil Cleetus Chanayil and Binesh E B as founders, and describes later products or applications including the NIYKADO Hybrid Six Stroke Engine, NIYKADO Power Generator and NIYKADO Pumps. The same profile claims that the six-stroke engine can reduce emissions to "very low or nearly negligible" levels and has "50 percent more fuel economy" compared to existing internal-combustion engine technology.

===== Engine functionality =====
The patent specification describes two versions of the NIYKADO six-stroke engine: a two-valve system and a four-valve system. In the two-valve system, the additional strokes are described as a buffer stroke and a retake stroke between the power and exhaust strokes. In the four-valve system, the two additional strokes are an air intake stroke and an air final exhaust stroke, added after the normal exhaust stroke.

In the four-valve version, the six strokes are:

1. Intake stroke
2. Compression stroke
3. Power stroke
4. Exhaust stroke
5. Air intake stroke
6. Air final exhaust stroke

The four-valve version uses four valves:

- Air-fuel intake valve
- Air-only intake valve
- Combustion exhaust valve
- Air-only exhaust valve

Intake stroke

The piston moves from top dead center (TDC) to bottom dead center (BDC). The intake valve opens and the air-fuel mixture enters the cylinder.

Compression stroke

The piston moves from BDC to TDC, with the valves closed, compressing the air-fuel mixture.

Power stroke

The spark plug ignites the compressed air-fuel mixture. The piston is forced from TDC to BDC, and the piston motion is converted into crankshaft rotation.

Exhaust stroke

The piston moves from BDC to TDC while the combustion exhaust valve opens, forcing burned gases out of the cylinder.

Air intake stroke

The air-only intake valve opens while the piston moves from TDC to BDC, drawing air through a separate air inlet port into the cylinder. The patent specification states that this increases the oxygen content in the cylinder and improves combustion in the next cycle. Overdrive described the prototype as using this extra stroke to introduce cold air into the combustion chamber after the exhaust stroke.

Air final exhaust stroke

The air-only exhaust valve opens while the piston moves from BDC to TDC, forcing air out of the cylinder and completing the six-stroke cycle. Overdrive described the extra exhaust stroke as using the introduced air to clean leftover exhaust or unburnt gases from the cylinder before the next combustion cycle.

Overdrive reported that testing at the Automotive Research Association of India showed a 40 percent increase in economy and reduced NOx emissions, but also a 30 percent reduction in power. The article attributed the power reduction to the engine having only one power stroke in each six-stroke cycle.

==== Crower six-stroke engine ====
In a six-stroke engine prototyped in the United States by Bruce Crower, water is injected into the cylinder after the exhaust stroke and is instantly turned to steam, which expands and forces the piston down for an additional power stroke. Thus, waste heat that requires an air or water cooling system to discharge in most engines is captured and put to use driving the piston. Crower estimated that his design would reduce fuel consumption by 40% by generating the same power output at a lower rotational speed. The weight associated with a cooling system could be eliminated, but that would be balanced by a need for a water tank in addition to the normal fuel tank.

The Crower six-stroke engine was an experimental design that attracted media attention in 2006 because of an interview given by the 75-year-old American inventor, who has applied for a patent on his design. That patent application was subsequently abandoned.

=== Opposed-piston designs ===
These designs use two pistons per cylinder operating at different rates, with combustion occurring between the pistons.

==== Beare head ====
The design of the Beare-head engine was developed by Malcolm Beare of Australia. The technology combines a four-stroke engine bottom end with an opposed piston in the cylinder head working at half the cyclical rate of the bottom piston. Functionally, the second piston replaces the valve mechanism of a conventional engine. Claimed benefits include a 9% increase in power, and improved thermodynamic efficiency through an increased compression ratio enabled by the elimination of the hot exhaust valve.

==== M4+2 ====
The M4+2 engine working cycle animation

The idea was developed at the Silesian University of Technology, Poland, under the leadership of EngD Adam Ciesiołkiewicz. It was granted patent number 195052 by the Polish Patent Office.

The M4+2 engines have much in common with the Beare-head engines, combining two opposed pistons in the same cylinder. One piston works at half the cyclical rate of the other, but while the main function of the second piston in a Beare-head engine is to replace the valve mechanism of a conventional four-stroke engine, the M4+2 takes the principle one step further. The double-piston combustion engine's work is based on the cooperation of both modules. The air load change takes place in the two-stroke section of the engine. The piston of the four-stroke section is an air load exchange aiding system, working as a system of valves. The cylinder is filled with air or with an air-fuel mixture. The filling process takes place at overpressure by the slide inlet system. The exhaust gases are removed as in the classical two-stroke engine, by exhaust windows in the cylinder. The fuel is supplied into the cylinder by a fuel-injection system. Ignition is realized by two spark plugs. The effective power output of the double-piston engine is transferred by two crankshafts. The characteristic feature of this engine is an opportunity of continuous change of cylinder capacity and compression rate during engine work by changing the piston's location. The mechanical and thermodynamical models were meant for double-piston engines, which enable to draw up new theoretical thermodynamic cycle for internal combustion double-pistons engine.

The working principle of the engine is explained in the two- and four-stroke engines article.

=== Other two-piston designs ===
==== Piston-charger engine ====
In this engine, similar in design to the Beare head, a "piston charger" replaces the valve system. The piston charger charges the main cylinder and simultaneously regulates the inlet and the outlet aperture, leading to no loss of air and fuel in the exhaust. In the main cylinder, combustion takes place every turn as in a two-stroke engine, while lubrication is achieved in the same manner as in a four-stroke. Fuel injection can take place in the piston charger, in the gas-transfer channel or in the combustion chamber. It is also possible to charge two working cylinders with one piston charger. The combination of compact design for the combustion chamber together with no loss of air and fuel is claimed to give the engine more torque, more power and better fuel efficiency. The benefit of fewer moving parts and design is claimed to lead to lower manufacturing costs. The engine is claimed to be suited to alternative fuels since no corrosion or deposits are left on valves. The six strokes are:

1. Aspiration
2. Precompression
3. Gas transfer
4. Compression
5. Ignition
6. Ejection.

This is an invention of Helmut Kottmann from Germany, while working 25 years at MAHLE GmbH piston and cylinder construction. Kottman's US patents 3921608 and 5755191 are listed below.

==== Ilmor/Schmitz five-stroke ====
This design was invented by Belgian engineer Gerhard Schmitz, and has been prototyped by Ilmor Engineering.

These designs use two (or four, six, or eight) cylinders with a conventional Otto four-stroke cycle. An additional piston (in its own cylinder) is shared by the two Otto-cycle cylinders. The exhaust from the Otto-cycle cylinder is directed into the shared cylinder, where it is expanded, generating additional work. This is in some respects similar to the operation of a compound steam engine, with the Otto-cycle cylinders being the high-pressure stage and the shared cylinder the low-pressure stage. The operation of the engine is:

HP1 (Otto)	LP (shared)	HP2 (Otto)
exhaust	expansion (power)	compression
intake	exhaust	power
compression	expansion (power)	exhaust
power	exhaust	intake

The designers consider this to be a five-stroke design, regarding the simultaneous HP exhaust stroke and LP expansion stroke as a single stroke. This design provides higher fuel efficiency due to the higher overall expansion ratio of the combined cylinders. Expansion ratios comparable to diesel engines can be achieved, while still using gasoline (petrol) fuel. Five-stroke engines allegedly are lighter and have higher power density than diesel engines.

==== Revetec engines ====
The controlled combustion engines, designed by Bradley Howell-Smith of Australian firm Revetec Holdings Pty Ltd, use opposed pairs of pistons to drive a pair of counter-rotating, three-lobed cams through bearings. These elements replace the conventional crankshaft and connecting rods, which enable the motion of the pistons to be purely axial, so that most of the power otherwise wasted on lateral motion of the con rods is effectively transferred to the output shaft. This gives six power strokes per revolution of the shaft (spread across a pair of pistons). An independent test measured the brake specific fuel consumption of Revetec's X4v2 prototype gasoline engine at 212g/kW-h (corresponding to an energy efficiency of 38.6%). Any even number of pistons can be used, in boxer or X configurations; the three lobes of the cams can be replaced by any other odd number greater than one; and the geometry of the cams can be changed to suit the needs of the target fuels and applications of the engines. Such variants may have 10 or more strokes per cycle.

== Related patents ==
=== Related U.S. patents ===
- 1217788 Internal combustion and steam engine Feb 27, 1917. Hugo F. Liedtke seems to be one of the first to contemplate alternating between internal combustion and steam injection into the combustion chamber.
- 1339176 Internal combustion engine May 4, 1920. Leonard H. Dyer invented the first 6-stroke internal combustion/water-injection engine in 1915.
- 2209706 Internal Combustion Engine Jul 30, 1940
- 3921608 Two-stroke internal combustion engine Nov 25, 1975
- 3964263 Six cycle combustion and fluid vaporization engine Jun 22, 1976
- 4143518 Internal combustion and steam engine Mar 13, 1979
- 4301655 Combination internal combustion and steam engine Nov 24, 1981
- 4433548 Combination internal combustion and steam engine Feb 28, 1984
- 4489558 Compound internal combustion engine and method for its use Dec 25, 1984
- 4489560 Compound internal combustion engine and method for its use Dec 25, 1984
- 4736715 Engine with a six-stroke cycle, variable compression ratio, and constant stroke Apr 12, 1988
- 4917054 Six-stroke internal combustion engine Apr 17, 1990
- 4924823 Six-stroke internal combustion engine May 15, 1990
- 5755191 Two-stroke internal combustion engine with charging cylinder May 26, 1998
- 6253745 Multiple stroke engine having fuel and vapor charges Jul 3, 2001
- 6311651 Computer-controlled six-stroke internal combustion engine and its method of operation Nov 6, 2001
- 6571749 Computer-controlled six-stroke cycle internal combustion engine and its method of operation Jun 3, 2003
- 7021272 Computer controlled multi-stroke cycle power generating assembly and method of operation Apr 4, 2006

=== Related Indian patents ===
- IN patent 252642 Six Stroke Engine May 25, 2012

=== Related Polish patents ===
- Bulletin of the Polish Patent Office, No 12(664)1999 p. 53, Pat. No P323508 "the working principle of an internal combustion of multistroke engine" (by Antoni Gnoiński, constructor from Będzin, Poland)
