= CCE =

The initialism CCE may refer to:

== Organizations ==
- Canadian Cinema Editors
- Chicago Climate Exchange
- Coca-Cola Enterprises, a major bottler of Coca-Cola
- Comhaltas Ceoltóirí Éireann, an organisation in Ireland which is dedicated to the promotion of Irish music, song, dance and language
- Congregation for Catholic Education, a dicastery of the Roman Curia
- Co-operative Central Exchange, an American consumer cooperative wholesale distributor
- Council on Chiropractic Education, an accrediting agency for chiropractic schools, and its international affiliates
- Creativity, Culture and Education, an organisation created to improve the quality and reach of cultural education

== Science ==
- Capacitative Calcium Entry
- Congenital cystic eye, a rare ocular malformation
- Connected Consumer Electronics, a field related to Machine to Machine (M2M) communication
- Controlled Combustion Engine
- Copolymer Composition Equation, another name for the Mayo-Lewis equation
- Current crowding effect

== Education ==
- a university department or school of Chemistry and Chemical Engineering, e.g. at Queen's University Belfast
- Continuous and Comprehensive Evaluation, a system of evaluation introduced by the Central Board of Secondary Education of India
- Centre for Continuing Education, part of the University of Sydney
- EDHEC Sailing Cup (Course Croisière EDHEC), a student sailing race on the French Atlantic Coast

== Other ==
- Camouflage Central-Europe, a French woodland camouflage pattern
- The Catalog of Copyright Entries by the United States Copyright Office
- Certified Culinary Educator, an American Culinary Federation (ACF) certification
- Daytona USA: Championship Circuit Edition, a video game
- Java.lang.ClassCastException, in Java programming
- Continuing Criminal Enterprise, a type of criminal organization defined in law in the USA.
- Cohiba (cigar brand) (Cohiba Corona Especiales), a Cuban cigar
- Correspondence Chess Expert, a title in correspondence chess
- The IATA airport code of Capital International Airport (Egypt)
