= Controlled combustion engine =

Experimental internal combustion engine

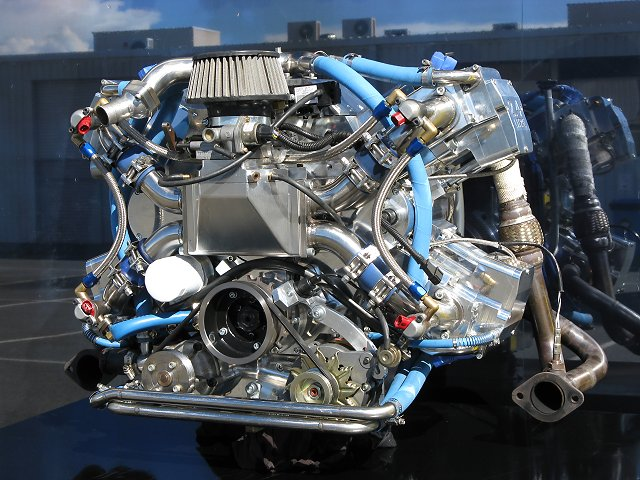
Revetec X4v2 prototype engine

Controlled combustion engine (CCE) is a term used by TechViki, an engine design company, to identify a type of experimental internal combustion engine (ICE) designed by Brad Howell-Smith. It uses two counter-rotating cams instead of a crankshaft. Pairs of cylinders oppose each other in a boxer flat engine or X engine arrangement.

== History ==
The idea came to Howell-Smith, an automotive engineer residing in Australia, during REM sleep in 1995. He designed five different engine layouts with variations on each and established Revolution Engine Technologies Pty Ltd in 1996 with a budget of A$2,000. The first working prototype was built by father-in-law Peter Koch in Howell-Smith's garage. Howell-Smith founded a company named Revetec Limited and set up a research and development site in Sydney. The prototype was displayed at the 1996 Sydney International Motor Show which brought public awareness to the design. Work began on a second prototype intended for use in generators and pumps, however interest expressed by the Middle East automotive market shifted focus towards automotive applications.

== Engine description ==
The Revetec engine design consists of two counter-rotating "trilobate" (three lobed) cams geared together, so both cams contribute to forward motion. Two bearings run along the profile of both cams (four bearings in all) and stay in contact with the cams at all times. The bearings are mounted on the underside of the two inter-connected pistons, which maintain the desired clearance throughout the stroke.

The two cams rotate and raise the piston with a scissor-like action to the bearings. Once at the top of the stroke the air-fuel mixture is fired. This is the power stroke during which the maximum mechanical advantage is reached after the piston has moved approximately 5% of its travel from top dead centre (approx. 10° ATDC), which makes better use of the high cylinder pressures at this point in the cycle. In comparison, a conventional engine reaches its maximum mechanical advantage after the piston has moved approximately 40% of its travel from TDC (approx. 60° ATDC). A side effect of this is a CCE can idle at much lower RPM.

Because the piston assembly only moves in one dimension (unlike the case in an engine with connecting rods), contact with the cylinder wall is minimised, which reduces wear and lubrication requirements. The cams create less piston shock, which allows ceramic components to be used. The engine can run in either direction if symmetrical lobes are used.

The effective cranking distance is determined by the length from the point of bearing contact to the centre of the output shaft (not the stroke).

The dual bearings contact the two cams in the opposite side which cancels the side forces out. The piston assembly does not experience any side force which reduces wear and lubrication requirements at the cylinder contact. One module, which consists of a minimum of five moving components, produces six power strokes per revolution. Increasing the number of lobes on each cam to five produces ten power strokes without increasing the number of components.

== Claimed advantages ==
The following advantages are claimed for the CCE engine at.

- Predicted production power to dressed weight ratio is 0.40 bhp/lb, based on 2007 testing of the X4v2 engine. For comparison a Continental 100 hp (75 kW) engine is 0.465 hp/lb, dressed
- Efficiency - recent tests gave good results, for a gasoline engine, when running lean.
- Fewer moving and total components. As a result of fewer components, more easily manufactured than conventional engines.
- Identical cylinder head assembly (“top end") to conventional engines. Most existing head technology can be either adapted or utilised.
- Flexible design - can be four-stroke, two-stroke, petrol, diesel or gas, natural or forced aspiration.
- Eliminated irregularly reciprocating components such as connecting rods. No second order balancing required.
- Output shaft can be run in either direction if multilobed cams with symmetrical lobes are employed.
- The CCE can be designed to operate at greatly reduced operating speeds while delivering high torque output.
- Substantial reduction in stroke reduces heat loss through cylinder wall.
- Extended piston dwell is possible because engine design allows a lower than normal compression ratio to be used reducing power loss from compression cycle.
- Able to fire on a leaner mixture than conventional engines.
- Maximum mechanical advantage can be applied to output shaft at only 20 degrees ATDC utilising high cylinder pressure early in the stroke, compared to around 60 degrees ATDC for conventional engines.
- Lower emissions can be achieved due to increased control over combustion.
- Low idle speed due to increase in mechanical efficiency at the top of the stroke.
- Little or no bore contact/piston side thrust, which reduces wear on cylinder bore.
- Can have different port timing on compression stroke than power stroke allowing better control.
- Lower centre of gravity on the boxer design.
- Due to controlled piston acceleration rates the CCE reduces engine vibration.
- A hollow output shaft can be utilised for specialty applications, such as peristaltic pumps.

== Disadvantages ==
The following have yet to be verified independently.

- Vibration
- Reliability, especially when running lean as is required for good economy.
- Emissions

== Patents ==
U.S. Patent 5,992,356 "Opposed piston combustion engine "; November 30, 1999; Howell-Smith; Bradley David (Worongary, AU).

Revetec has a Patent Cooperation Treaty (PCT) patent application pending for the "X" design lodged late 2006.

== Performance ==
A dyno graph of the Revetec 1.38litr engine is shown on their development page, shows a flat torque curve.

Test results (11 November 2007) on the X4v2 engine showing torque and power curves and the fuel injection map.

In April 2008, Revetec completed their first Independently Certified Test Report carried out by Orbital Australia, achieving a repeatable BSFC figure of 212g/kW-h (38.6% efficiency).
