= Eisenhuth Horseless Vehicle Company =

American automobile manufacturer in the 1900s

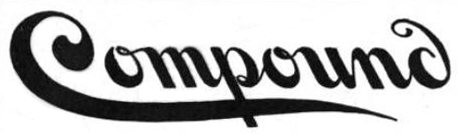
- Type: Automobile Manufacturing
- Industry: Automotive
- Founded: 1904; 122 years ago
- Defunct: 1908; 118 years ago
- Headquarters: New York City, United States
- Area served: United States
- Products: Automobiles; Automotive parts

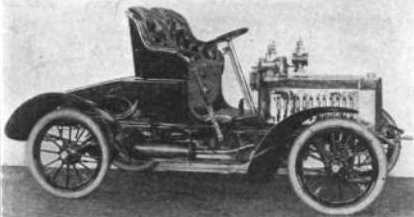
1905 Compound Model 4

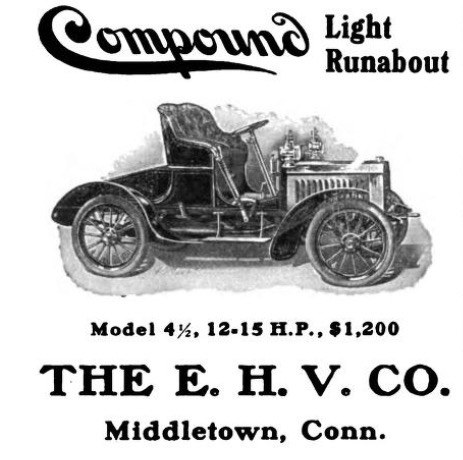
Compound Model 4 (1905)

Eisenhuth Horseless Vehicle Company was a manufacturer of brass era automobiles originally based in New York City. In 1902 the company purchased the Keating Wheel and Automobile Company and established manufacturing operations in Middletown, Connecticut. During 1903, the company merged with the Graham Fox Motor Car Company, absorbing that firm and expanding operations in Middletown.

In 1904, the company was sued by Colonel Frank A. Fox of the Graham Fox Motor Car Company, who claimed that he had "invented certain essential features of the motors now being made by the Eisenhuth company," and went bankrupt in 1907. In 1909, the Eisenhuth factory was sold to the "Noiseless Typewriter Company."

Their automobile was an unusual model called the Compound with a three-cylinder compound internal combustion engine. Two were working cylinders, the larger middle one further expanded the exhaust gases of the outer working cylinders, this concept received later the name: '5-Stroke engine'.

== History ==
The 1904 Compound was a touring car model. Equipped with a tonneau, it could seat 7 passengers and sold for $6000 to 8000. The vertical-mounted straight-3, situated at the front of the car, produced 35 hp (26.1 kW). A 3-speed sliding gear transmission was fitted. The car weighed 3100 lb (1406 kg).

In 1906, it had the Compound Doctor Stanhope or Compound Dostor with 12 to 15 Hp at a cost of US$ 1400 value.
