= Two- and four-stroke engines =

Two-and-four stroke engines

Two- and four-stroke engines are engines that combine elements from both two-stroke and four-stroke engines. They usually incorporate two pistons.

== M4+2 engine ==
The M4+2 engine, also known as the double-piston internal combustion engine, is a type of internal combustion engine invented by Polish patent holder Piotr Mężyk.

The M4+2 engine took its name from a combination of two-stroke engines and four-stroke engines. The two-stroke combustion engine is characterized by a simple construction and system of air load change, as well as a bigger index of power output. The cylinders of both modules of the double-pistons engine have been joined along one axis with a common cylinder head in the form of a ring. The pistons are moved at different speeds and with appropriate stage displacement. The two crankshafts are connected with a special transmission that rotates the four-stroke crankshaft at twice the speed of the two stroke crankshaft. In the M4+2, the advantages of both engines being connected are obvious; the pistons of the engine working in one combustion cylinder are set opposite to each other but in different modes. Opposed-piston engines have been tried before in both 2 stroke and 4 stroke, the combination of the two different cycles is unique to this engine. The engine has a far greater efficiency over the break-even value known to combustion engines (about 35%) and closer to the one associated with steam turbines or electric engines (about 70%).

The M4+2 prototype constructed at the Silesian University of Technology, Poland

Advantages:

- More efficient power production (150 horsepower from 1000 cc of volume in the basic version)
- Ability to use different fuel types (natural plant oils as well as petroleum)
- Much better ecological effects – a huge reduction of carbon dioxide and other gases emission
- Lower fuel consumption
- Prolonged stroke expansion
- Possibility to change the compression parameters without having to stop the engine
- Simplicity of construction

The idea was developed at the Silesian University of Technology, Poland, under the leadership of Adam Ciesiołkiewicz. It was granted the patent number 195052 by the Polish Patent Office. The work with the new combustion engine has been done by IZOLING P.W. Company in cooperation with the Silesian University of Technology in Gliwice. Consultations with researchers from Technical University of Kraków were also held. So far, two working engine models have been made. The preliminary model is based on two existing engines (a two-stroke motorbike engine and a four-stroke small machine engine). This model confirms the concept of two- and four-stroke engines' connection. The second model is the functional model. The new solution for a combustion engine was presented during scientific conferences (KONES '2002, Seminary of biofuels 2003, etc.) and in mass media (journals, newspapers, TVP, radio).

=== The M4+2 engine working cycle ===
The M4+2 engine working cycle animation

The stages of the working cycle:

- Gas exhaust
- Fresh-air inlet (two stages)
- Medium compression
- Two-stage combustion
- Gas expansion

The filling process takes place at the overpressure phase, using a mechanical gas compressor and a throttle for the purpose of regulation.

The load change is assisted by a four-stroke piston, working as a dynamic boosting system and allowing the good scavenging of working space.

A possibility exists of changing the relative piston positions during the engine work, which gives the possibility of changing the compression ratio depending on the temporary level of the load. This suggests the possibility of different fuels for combustion (low-octane petrol, biofuels with high levels of vegetable components).

The working cycle is characterized by an almost constant combustion characteristic of the working space volume increasing during the expansion stage.

The engine is characterized by:

- Extended gas expansion and limited exhaust gas temperature on the outlet;
- The variability of the compression ratio and the possibility of changing the compression ratio during the engine work depending on load.
- A beneficial changing of working space during the mixture compression with different crankshafts' polar locations. That makes the pressure forming in the cylinder possible (within reasonable limits).
- An almost constant characteristic of volume increasing during the expansion stage at different piston positions (it influences the steady power transport).

Calculations prove the new engine has more favorable parameters and work indicators:

- The increase of engine thermal efficiency (Although the mechanical efficiency is lesser than a conventional engine)
- Higher total efficiency – efficiency characteristic is more favorable at medium load. It is comparable with the diesel engine efficiency, so the exploitation of fuel consumption is relatively smaller.
- The higher torque and the higher power output compared to the four-stroke SI engine with the same stroke volume

=== Ricardo 2x4 engine ===
The two-cycle modes are currently being researched at Ricardo Consulting Engineers in the UK. The concept consists in switching from one mode to the other depending on the rpm value. The four-stroke engine is more efficient when running at full throttle, while the opposite is the case for the two-stroke engine. When a small car under heavy load runs at half speed, the engine automatically switches to the two-cycle mode, which is then more efficient. The research on this showed a 27% reduction in fuel consumption.

The M4+2 engine has a four-stroke piston and a two-stroke piston. The shaft of the four-stroke piston rotates twice as fast as the shaft of the two-stroke piston, and the two-stroke part always runs at half speed. This ensures that both parts work optimally regarding fuel consumption at all times. The same principles apply to having two distinct engines, but the design of the M4+2 is much simpler.

== See also ==
- Six-stroke engine
- Rotary engine
