= James Atkinson (inventor) =

British engineer, inventor (1846–1914)

- Born: 1846
- Died: 1914 (aged 67–68)
- Occupations: Engineer, inventor

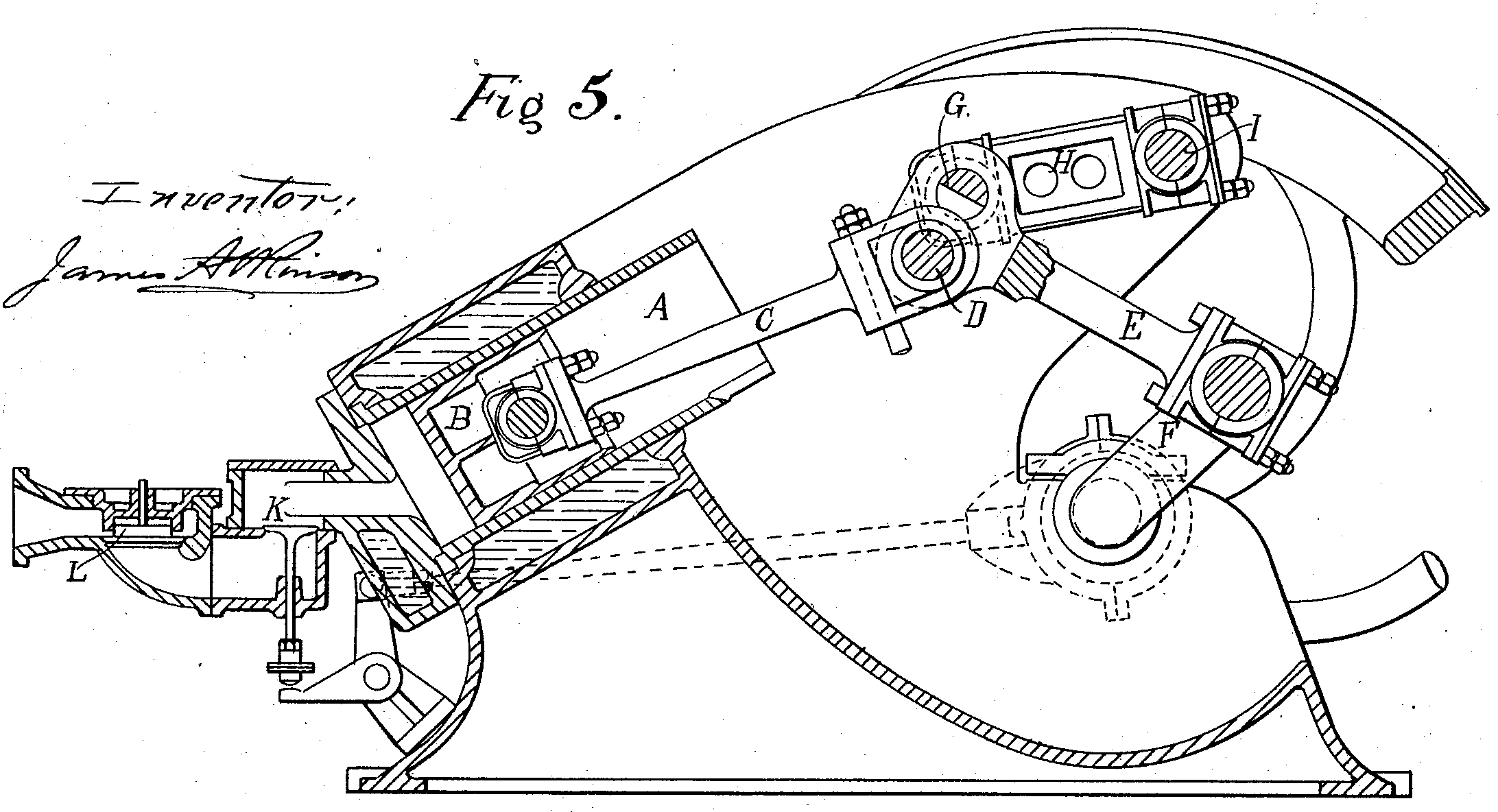
Atkinson Gas Engine as shown in US Patent 367496

James Atkinson (1846 – 1914) of Hampstead was a British engineer who invented several engines with greater efficiency than the Otto cycle. The Atkinson cycle engines were named the "Differential 1882", "Cycle 1887" and "Utilite 1892". The most well-known of Atkinson's engines is the "Cycle 1887", patented in 1887. By use of variable engine strokes from a complex crankshaft, Atkinson was able to increase the efficiency of his engine, at the cost of some power, over traditional Otto-cycle engines. He was awarded the John Scott Medal of The Franklin Institute in 1889.

== See also ==
- History of the internal combustion engine
