= Silesian University of Technology =

Technical university based in Gliwice, Poland

Coordinates: 50°17′27″N 18°40′30″E

- Politechnika Śląska
- Latin: Silesia Universitas Technologica
- Type: Public
- Established: May 24, 1945
- Rector: Professor Marek Pawełczyk
- Students: 15,790 (12.2023)
- Location: Gliwice, Silesia, Poland
- Campus: Urban campuses in 3 cities
- Website: www.polsl.pl/en

University rankings

Regional – Overall
- QS Emerging Europe and Central Asia: 95 (2022)

The Silesian University of Technology (Polish name: Politechnika Śląska; Polish pronunciation: [pɔliˈtɛxɲika ˈɕlɔ̃ska]) is a public university in Gliwice, Poland. Established in 1945, the university is one of the 10 officially recognized research universities in Poland.

The Silesian University of Technology was founded by professors of the Lwów Polytechnic who were forced to leave their native city after World War II. Owing to its location in the most industrialized part of Poland at the time, the university quickly grew and expanded beyond the original campus into the neighboring cities.

In 2026, the prestigious Perspektywy Foundation ranked it as the 5th best university of technology and the 8th overall university in Poland.

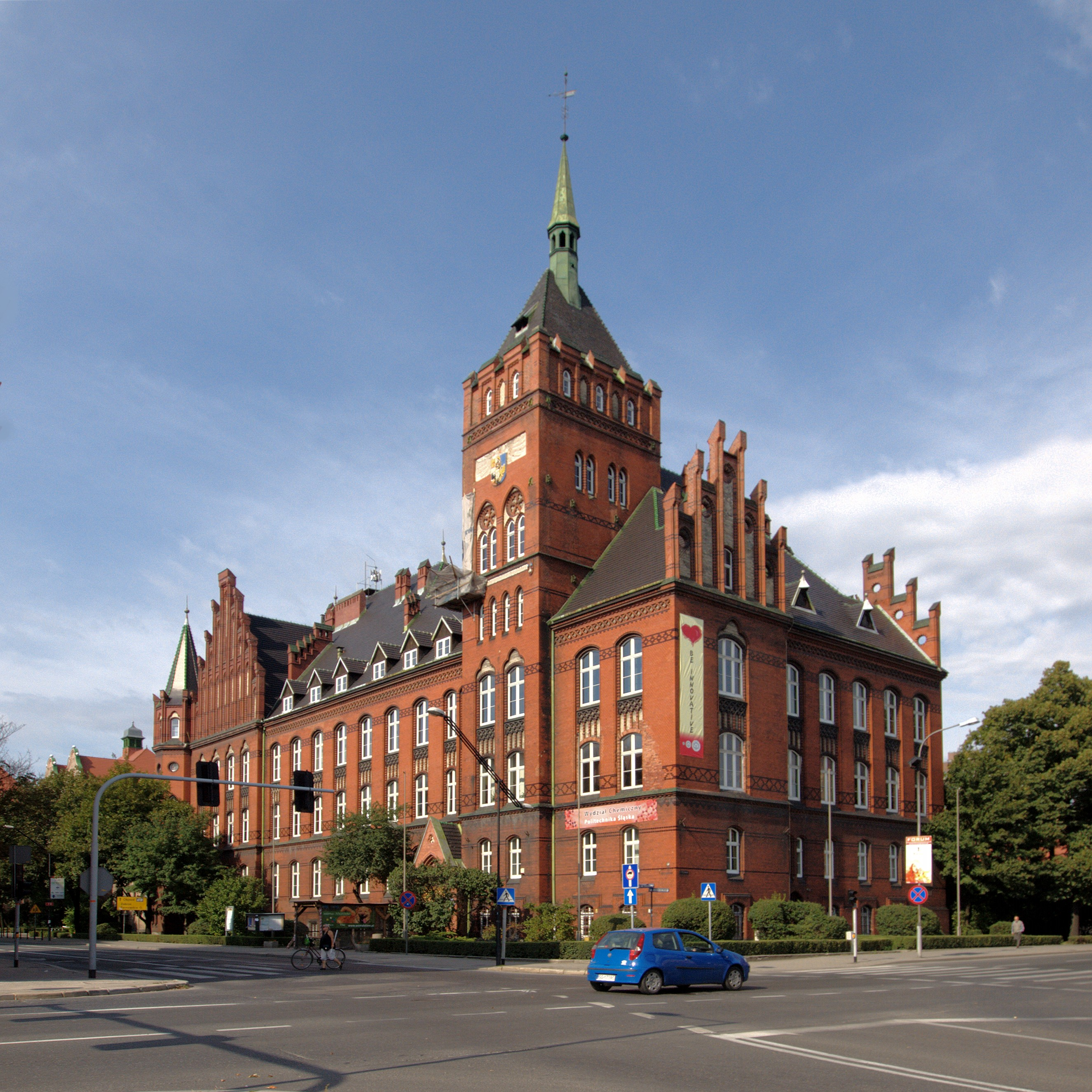
Faculty of Chemistry

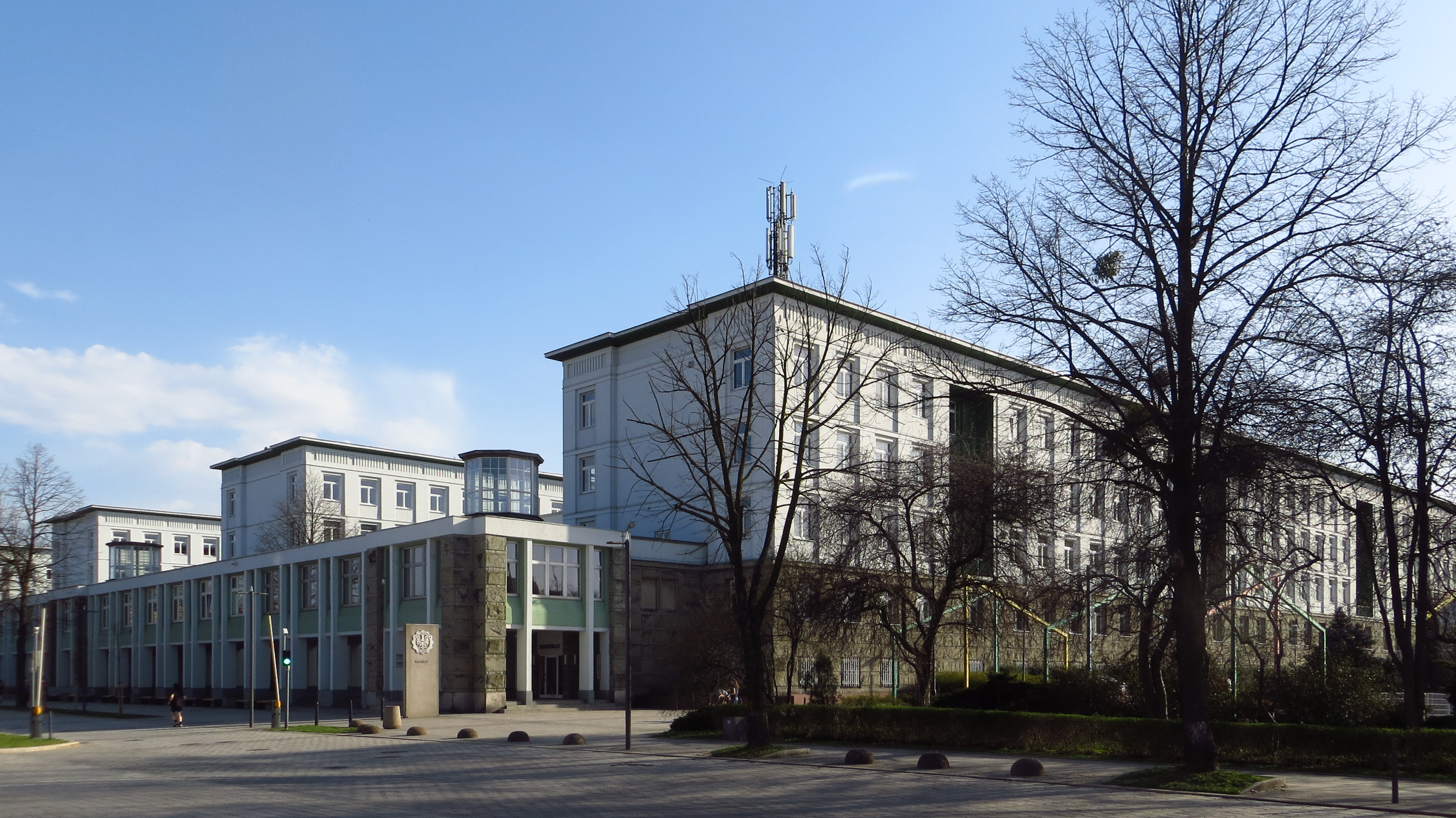
Faculty of Mining, Safety Engineering and Industrial Automation

== Organization ==
Silesian University of Technology is organized into 13 faculties and 1 research institute:

- Faculty of Architecture,
- Faculty of Automatic Control, Electronics and Computer Science,
- Faculty of Civil Engineering,
- Faculty of Chemistry,
- Faculty of Electrical Engineering,
- Faculty of Mining, Safety Engineering and Industrial Automation,
- Faculty of Biomedical Engineering
- Faculty of Materials Engineering,
- Faculty of Energy and Environmental Engineering,
- Faculty of Applied Mathematics,
- Faculty of Mechanical Engineering,
- Faculty of Organization and Management,
- Faculty of Transport and Aviation Engineering,
- Institute of Physics - Centre for Science and Education

Ten of these are situated in Gliwice, two in Katowice and two in Zabrze.

== Affiliations ==
University rankings

Global – Overall
- THE World: 1001+ (2020)

The university is affiliated with the following organizations:

- European University Association (EUA)
- European Society for Engineering Education (SEFI)
- The Innovation Cluster for Entrepreneurship Education of the Erasmus+ Programme
- Alliance of Universities for Democracy (AUDEM)
- Trans-European Mobility Programme for University Studies (TEMPUS)
- Erasmus Programme which evolved into the Socrates programme
- Leonardo da Vinci programme
- Central European Exchange Program for University Studies (CEEPUS)
- Index Copernicus
- European Cooperation in Science and Technology (COST)
- The EUREKA intergovernmental organization for research and development funding and coordination
