= Chestnut Hill Reservation =

State park in Massachusetts, United States

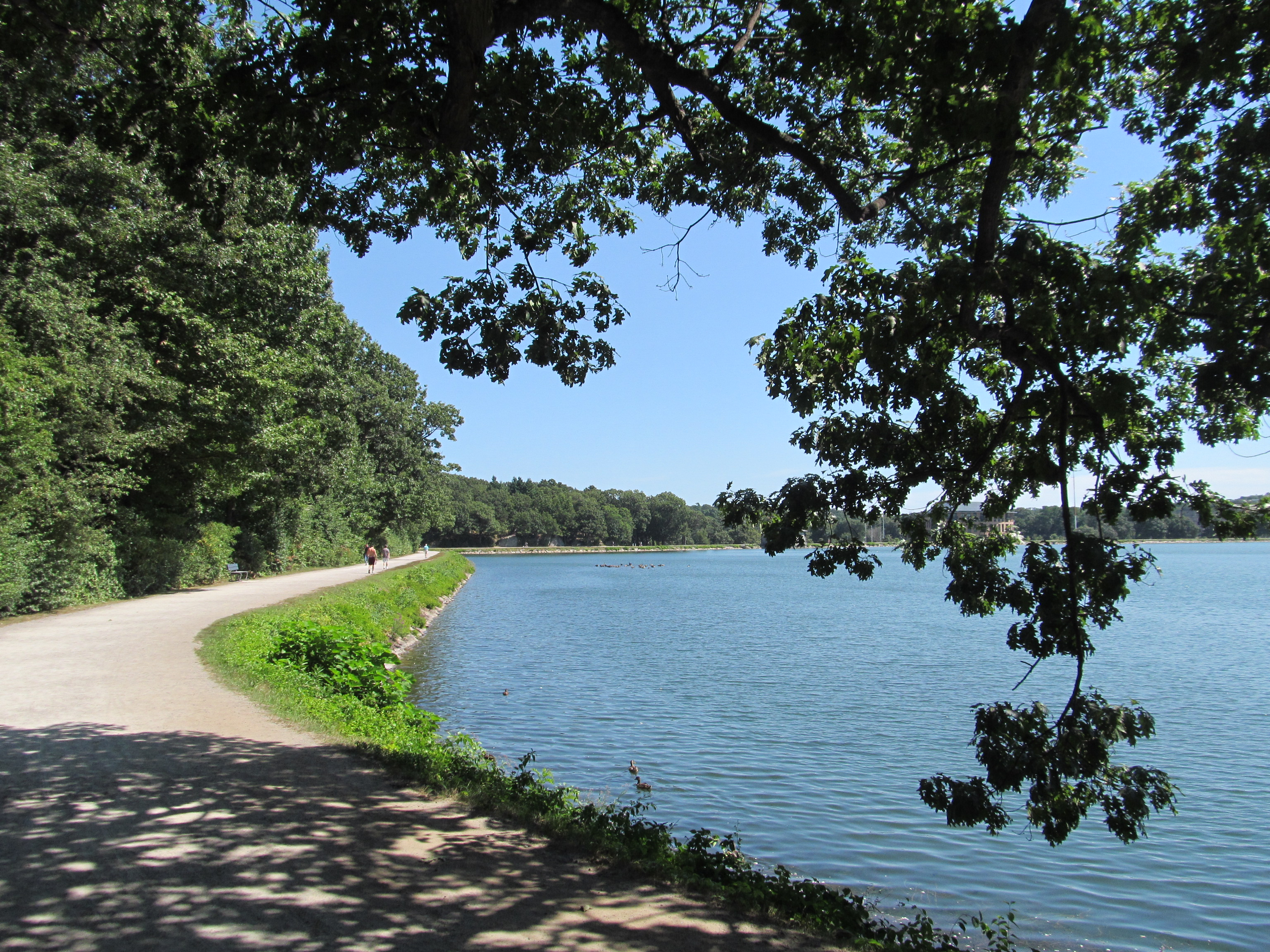

- Location within Greater Boston area Location within Massachusetts Location within the United States
- Location: Boston, Massachusetts, United States
- Coordinates: 42°20′07″N 71°09′29″W
- Area: 120 acres (49 ha)
- Elevation: 131 ft (40 m)
- Established: 1962
- Administrator: Massachusetts Department of Conservation and Recreation
- Website: Official website

Chestnut Hill Reservation is a public recreation area and historic preserve surrounding the Chestnut Hill Reservoir in the Chestnut Hill and Brighton neighborhoods of Boston, Massachusetts, United States. The reserve is part of the Chestnut Hill Reservoir Historic District, is listed on the National Register of Historic Places, and is a City of Boston Landmark. It is managed by the Department of Conservation and Recreation.

== Activities and amenities ==
A one-mile walking path encircles the reservoir. Shoreline fishing is offered. The reservoir is a popular birding location, where at least 195 species have been observed. The Reilly Memorial Recreation Center beside the reservoir has a swimming pool and skating rink. A building across the street from the reservoir, which housed pumping equipment for the water system, has been converted into the Metropolitan Waterworks Museum.

== Image gallery ==
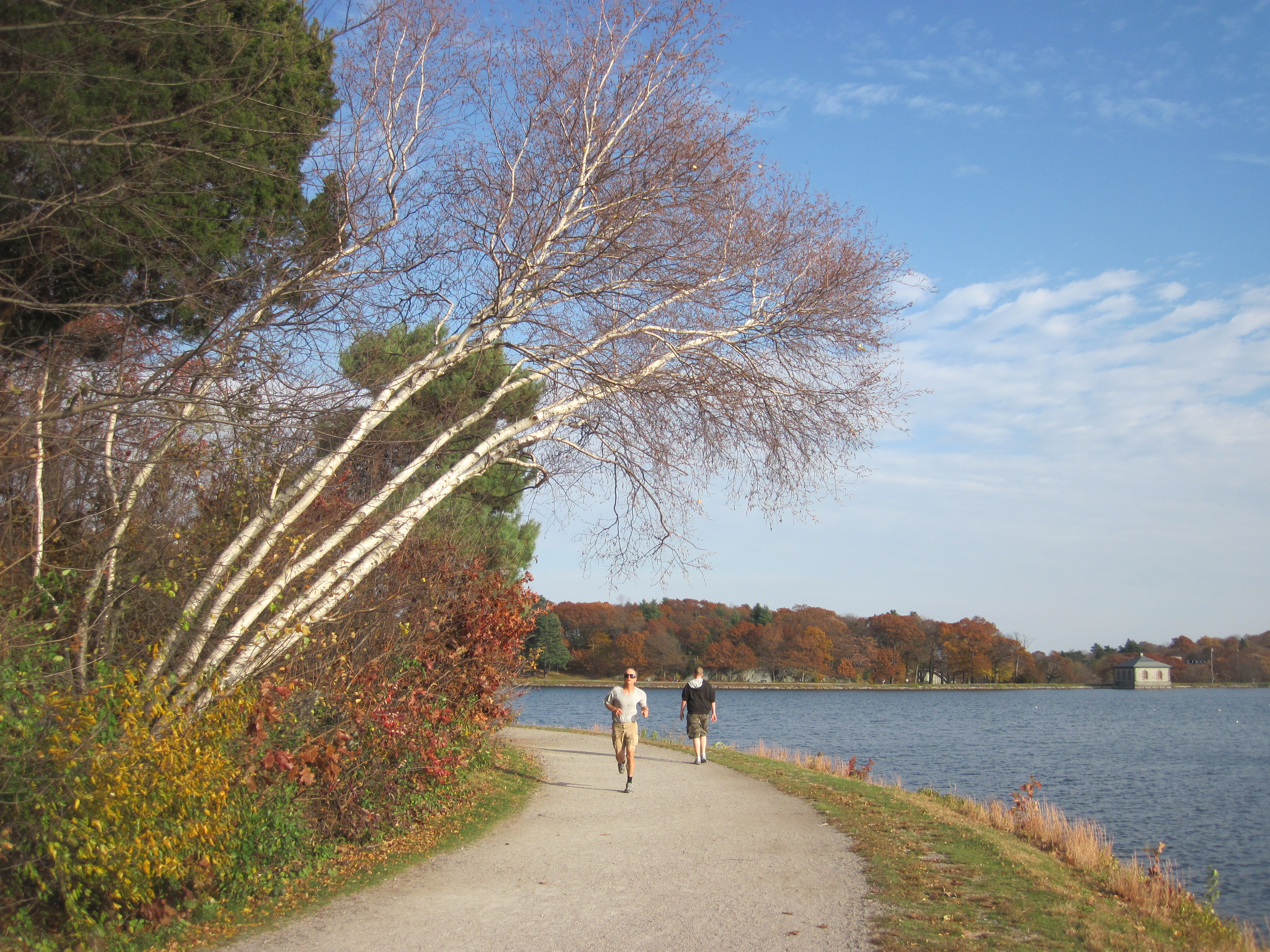
Joggers

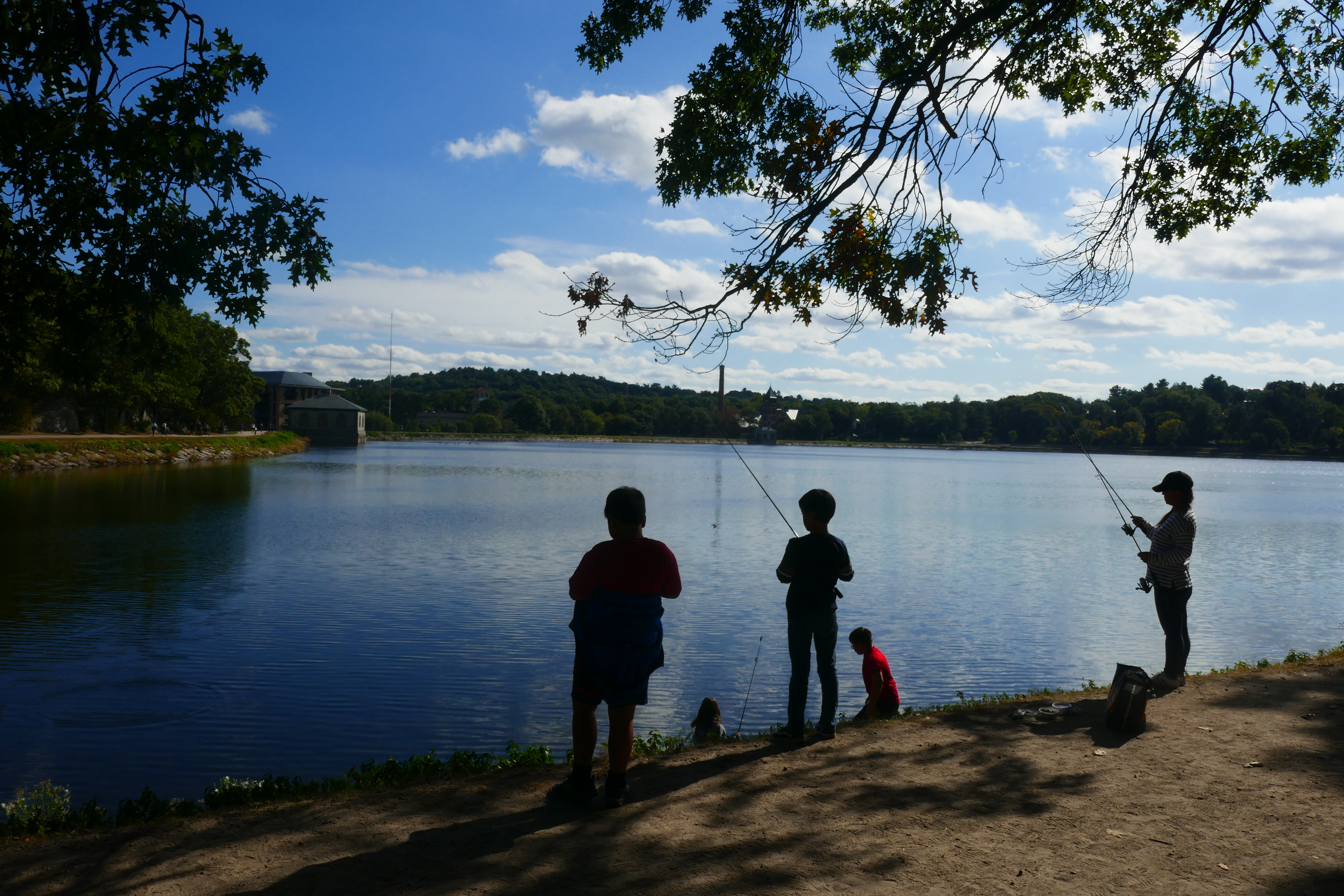
Fishing

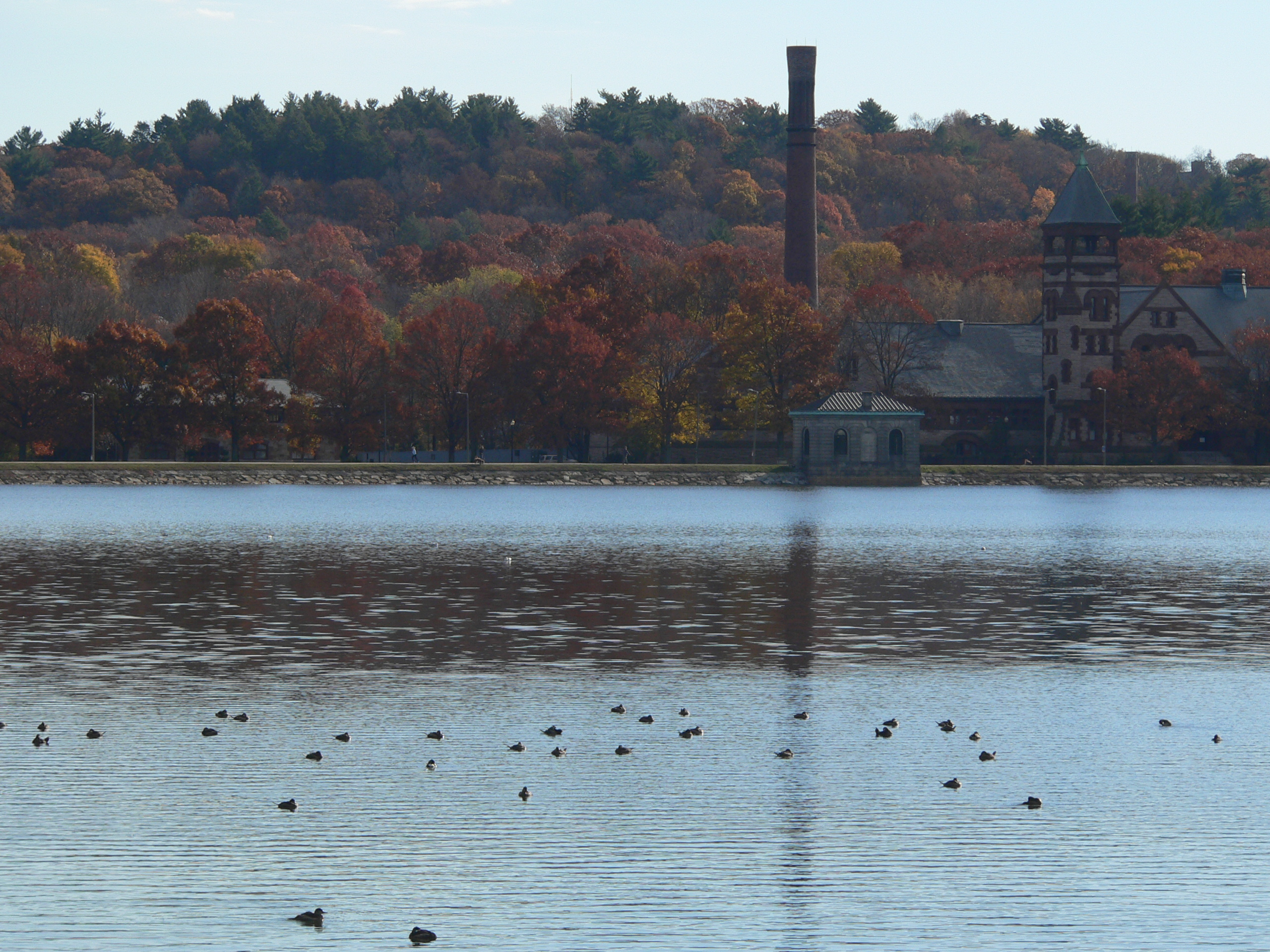
Migrating waterbirds in winter

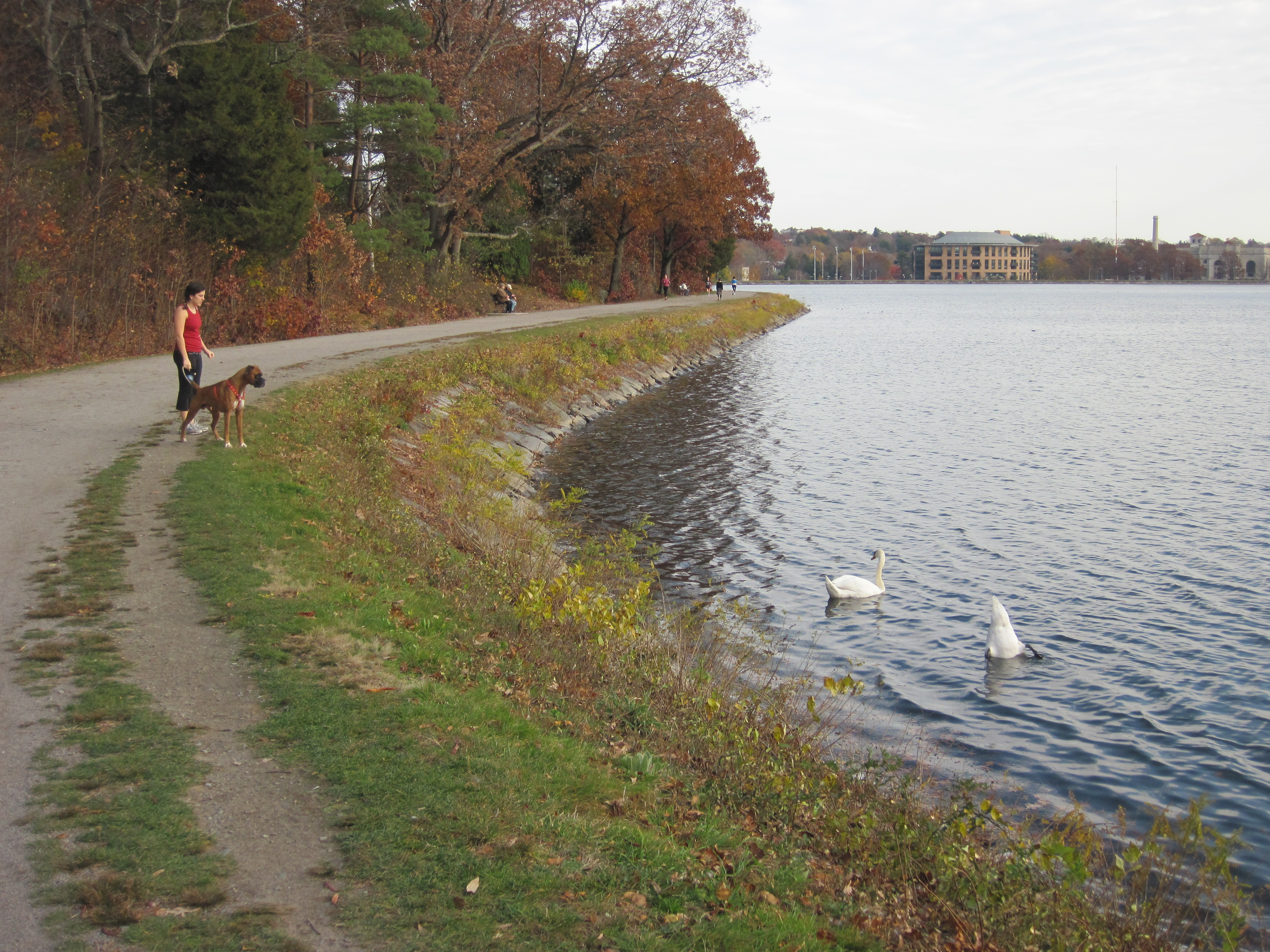
Walking path

== See also ==
- National Register of Historic Places listings in Boston, Massachusetts
- National Register of Historic Places listings in Massachusetts
