= Theory and Construction of a Rational Heat Motor =

1894 essay by German engineer Rudolf Diesel

- First edition
- Author: Rudolf Diesel
- Original title: Theorie und Konstruktion eines rationellen Wärmemotors zum Ersatz der Dampfmaschine und der heute bekannten Verbrennungsmotoren
- Language: German
- Genre: Scientific literature
- Publisher: Verlag von Julius Springer
- Publication date: 10 January 1893; 133 years ago
- Publication place: German Realm
- English publication date: 1894
- Media type: Print
- ISBN: 978-3-642-64949-3

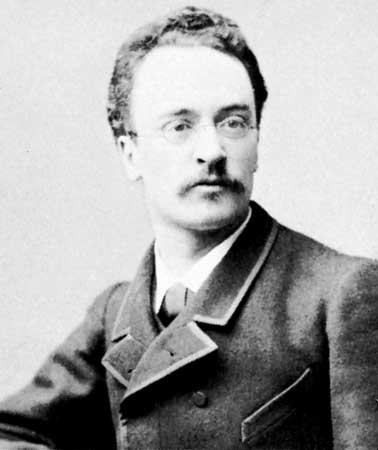
25-year-old Rudolf Diesel

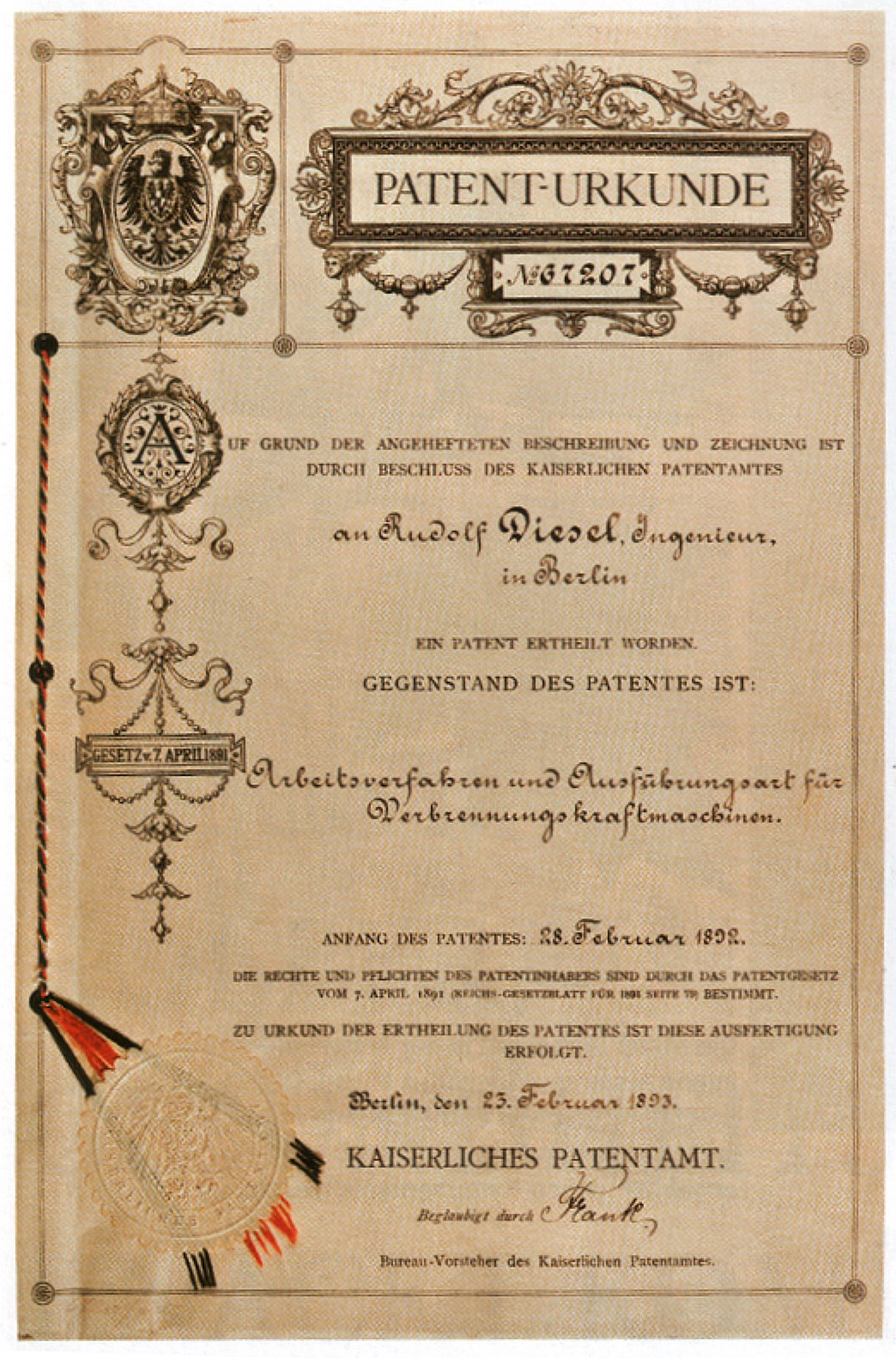
Diesel's patent DRP 67 207

Theory and Construction of a Rational Heat Motor (German: Theorie und Konstruktion eines rationellen Wärmemotors zum Ersatz der Dampfmaschine und der heute bekannten Verbrennungsmotoren; English: Theory and construction of a rational heat motor with the purpose of replacing the steam engine and the internal combustion engines known today) is an essay written by German engineer Rudolf Diesel. It was composed in 1892, and first published by Springer in 1893. A translation into English followed in 1894. One thousand copies of the German first edition were printed. In this essay, Rudolf Diesel describes his idea of an internal combustion engine based on the Carnot cycle, transforming heat energy into kinetic energy using high pressure, with a thermal efficiency of up to 73%, outperforming any steam engine of the time.

Diesel sent copies of his essay to famous German engineers and university professors for spreading and promoting his idea. He received plenty of negative feedback; many considered letting Diesel's heat engine become reality unfeasible, because of the high pressures of 200–300 atm (20.3–30.4 MPa) occurring, which they thought machines of the time could not withstand. Only few found the actual mistake in Diesel's theory: Isothermal-adiabatic compression, which the theory is based on, is impossible. Even with almost isothermal-adiabatic compression, an engine could not operate because of the lean air-fuel mixture. In other words, an engine as described in the essay would require so much compression work that it could not perform any useful work.

Yet, some scientists of the time praised Diesel's idea, which would lead into Maschinenfabrik Augsburg and Krupp Essen forming a consortium for building Diesel's engine. Diesel, who was then ordered to build his own engine, realised his mistake and considered using a modified combustion process. Key changes are the way of compression, which is only adiabatic in the modified combustion process, the pressure, which Diesel reduced significantly, and the fuel injection, where Diesel increased the fuel quantity. In 1897, after four years of work, Diesel had successfully finished his rational heat motor using his modified combustion process. This engine became known as the Diesel engine. Publicly, Diesel never admitted that he had to use a different combustion process from that one he described in his essay, because this would have rendered his heat motor patent obsolete.

== Content summary ==
Theory and Construction of a Rational Heat Motor has nine chapters in total. The first chapter describes the theory of combustion, and is separated into five individual combustion processes, out of which the third is the constant pressure process used for the rational heat motor. Therefore, it is described in more detail in this article. In the second chapter, Diesel describes how he intends to design and build an engine with an indicated power of 100 PS. With the third chapter, Diesel tries to address using a process with adiabatic compression only; the fourth chapter describes designing a real motor for this modified process. The fifth chapter addresses yet another modified process, with an incomplete expansion phase, but Diesel does not include a design concept. Furthermore, he considers a completely closed cycle in the sixth chapter and using his invention as a refrigerator in the seventh chapter. His theories on how to use a rational heat motor are described in the eighth chapter. The ninth chapter includes additional comments. His additional work Nachträge zur Bröschüre is not included in the original essay, but in newer editions, it serves as a tenth chapter.

- Theorie der Verbrennung (Theory of combustion)
- Konstruktion des vollkommenen Motors (Construction of the ideal motor)
- Erste Abweichung vom vollkommenen Process (First deviation from the ideal process)
- Konstruktion des Motors für den abweichenden Process (Construction of the motor for the deviating process)
- Andere Abweichungen vom vollkommenenen Process (Additional deviations from the ideal process)
- Der neue Motor als geschlossene Maschine (The new motor in a closed cycle)
- Der neue Motor als Kälteerzeugungsmaschine (The new motor as a refrigerator)
- Anwendungen des neuen Motors (Applications of the new motor)
- Schlussbemerkungen (Conclusions)
- Nachträge zur Broschüre (Supplement of the brochure)

== Theory of combustion and construction of the ideal motor ==
=== The principle ===
Diesel's idea of a rational heat motor was designing a cycle that would allow maximum heat utilisation, based on the Carnot cycle. To overcome the low efficiency of steam and combustion engines of the time, Diesel wanted to build an entirely new type of internal combustion engine. In the 1890s, regular gas engines were capable of transforming only 6% of the fuel energy into kinetic energy; good triple expansion steam engines were slightly better than that, they could convert 7.2% of the fuel energy into kinetic energy. Diesel said that his rational heat motor has a thermal efficiency of 73%, thus being capable of converting approximately ″6 to 7-times as much″ chemical energy into kinetic energy, meaning that it has an efficiency of approximately 50%. Diesel even claimed that future versions of his motor would have an even higher efficiency.

Despite relying on compression ignition, Diesel says that he never purposely designed his motor with this specific characteristic. In his patent DRP 67 207, Diesel describes that a motor with the best thermal efficiency would automatically have compression ignition. In his 1913 book Die Entstehung des Dieselmotors, he denies that compression ignition is a key feature of his motor:

Neither have I claimed compression ignition in any of my patents, nor have I stated it in my publications as a goal worth reaching

— Rudolf Diesel (Note: Ich habe die Selbstzündung weder jemals in meinen Patenten beansprucht, noch in meinen Schriften als ein zu erreichendes Ziel angegeben. — Diesel 2010. p 4)

On page 16 of Theory and Construction of a Rational Heat Motor, Diesel writes that ignition in his rational heat motor takes place either by means of artificial ignition or compression ignition:

Now ignition takes place, either artificially, or, if the temperature is high enough, by means of compression ignition

— Rudolf Diesel (Note: Nun findet Zündung statt, entweder künstlich oder, wenn die Temperatur hoch genug ist, durch Selbstentzündung. — Diesel 2013. p 16)

=== The third process ===
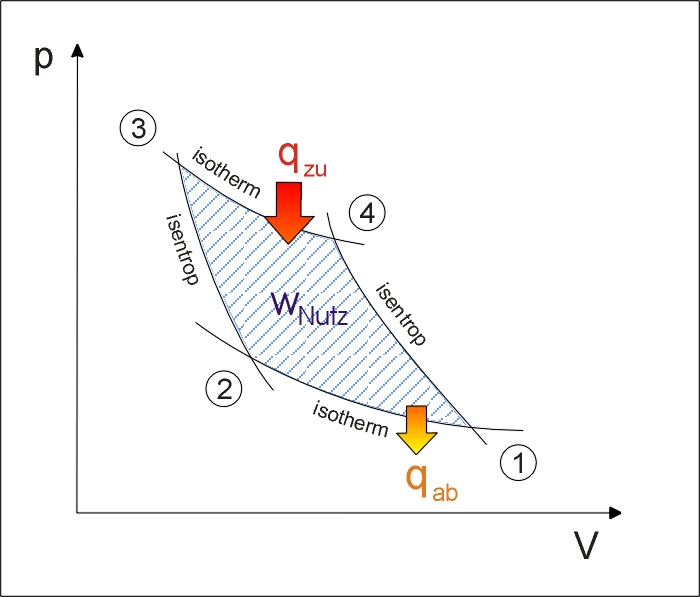
Ideal cycle

The Diesel process is a hypothetical constant-pressure model, with four distinct processes, a so-called cycle, meaning that these four distinct processes can be repeated over and over again. These distinct processes are the same processes that can be found in a four-stroke engine: intake, compression, combustion, exhaust. All four strokes combined form the cycle, which is supposed to result in useful work. The Diesel process uses a special compression stroke based on the idea that a gas can be compressed in a combined isothermal-adiabatic way. Isothermal means that the temperature during compression does not change, thus requiring heat dissipation; adiabatic means that the gas changes its volume, but without heat dissipation. This means that there is no waste heat.

For the means of compression, Diesel intended using a notional compression cylinder. This process requires work and consists of four phases:

- Intake, sucking in uncompressed air, requiring work.
- Compression with an isothermal curve (or a different curve), dissipating heat and requiring work.
- Compression with an adiabatic curve, requiring work.
- Emitting the combustion air, requiring work.

For the distinct combustion process, Diesel intended using a notional expansion cylinder. Again it consists of four phases:

- Gas entering with constant pressure, requiring work.
- Combustion with any curve, producing work, dissipating heat.
- Expansion of the gas with an adiabatic curve until atmospheric pressure is reached, producing work.
- Exhausting the gas, requiring work.

Adding these phases will result in a diagram similar to a Carnot diagram as shown on the right. Because fuel will be added to the gas, the start position 1 will not be identical with the end position 1, meaning that there is always slightly more work required. However, Diesel considered using a very lean air-fuel mixture, thus resulting in the amount of extra work required being insignificant. In theory, the combustion process ends at position 4 of the diagram. But this is not the end of the work formation taking place in the two phases combustion (3–4) and expansion (4–1), as explained. Diesel considered an isothermal expansion phase unfeasible, because it would cause a gigantic expansion cylinder, resulting in a very large and unpractical engine. This is why gas expansion is adiabatic and only taking place until atmospheric pressure is reached. He considered the additional work required, resulting in overall work loss, ″unimportant″, because he considered making a real motor more reasonable than focussing on the best efficiency. This resulted in the original Diesel diagram.

=== Wrong conclusion ===
Diesel's theory had three major problems:

- Isothermal-adiabatic compression, which is supposed to result in high efficiency, is not possible; hence, Diesel later revised his process.
- To reach a high thermal efficiency, Diesel intended using a high compression of 200–300 atm (20.3–30.4 MPa), which would result in too much friction loss.
- As thermal efficiency does not depend on the temperatures, Diesel intended reducing the combustion temperature by using a lean air-fuel mixture of 99.324:1, which would not allow combustion.

The thermal efficiency and motor work do not depend on the amount of air, but on the compression ratio. The greater the compression ratio will be, the better the thermal efficiency will be; this efficiency does not at all depend on the highest temperature of the process; therefore, having a high combustion temperature is not of interest, quite the opposite of a high temperature is needed; if the temperature is high, heat energy must be dissipated to prevent the motor parts from breaking, keeping lubrication up, etc.; high combustion temperatures increase this heat energy; therefore, we must reduce combustion temperature. The equation shows immediately that, for this purpose, a high amount of air has to be chosen. The high air-amount′s purpose is reducing the heat dissipation, thus requiring little to no water cooling.

— Rudolf Diesel (Note: Der thermische Wirkungsgrad hängt eben so wenig wie die Arbeit, von der Luftmenge ab, sondern der Hauptsache nach nur von (...) der Höhe der Kompression der Verbrennungsluft. Je höher man letztere komprimirt, um so höherer Wirkungsgrad ist zu erwarten; dieser Wirkungsgrad ist gänzlich unabhängig von der höchsten Temperatur, welche im Process erreicht wird; es liegt also nicht das geringste Interesse vor, (...) die Verbrennungstemperatur, hoch zu machen, im Gegentheil, wenn es hoch ist, muss man, um die Organe der Maschine zu erhalten, die Schmierung zu ermöglichen etc., viel Wärme durch Wasserkühlung nach aussen führen; grosse [Verbrennungstempereaturen] machen [die nach aussen abgeleitete Wärme] gross; wir müssen daher [die Verbrennungstemperatur] nach Möglichkeit erniedrigen. Gleichung (76) zeigt sofort, dass zu diesem Zweck [die angesaugte Luftmenge] hoch zu wählen ist. Die grosse Luftmenge hat daher den Zweck, [die nach aussen abgeleitete Wärme] zu erniedrigen, d. h. den Cylinder möglichst wenig durch Wasser zu kühlen. — Diesel 2013. p 24)

In fact, a high compression ratio increases efficiency, however, only to a certain point, because, like Diesel figured, too much heat energy would have to be dissipated and too much friction would occur, which could not be compensated by the engine's work. On the other hand, a compression ratio chosen too low results in insufficient heat utilisation. When designing his theory, Diesel already considered reducing compression to 90 atm (9.1 MPa), which he thought would result in only 5% thermal efficiency loss, but in a significant increase in actual efficiency, yet he recommends increasing pressure as much as possible. His solution for the heat dissipation problem was still wrong: He decided to use more air, resulting in an air-fuel mixture which is too lean. Such an air-fuel mixture cannot provide any work, because it cannot combust, not even with artificial ignition.

=== Criticism ===
As mentioned, Diesel was mostly criticised for his idea of a heat motor, but also received positive feedback. However, most critics did not criticise the theory's flaw, but that Diesel's heat engine used very high amounts of pressure to operate. Diesel himself acknowledged the feedback:

Publishing my essay caused fierce reviews ... on average, they were unfavourable, rather devastating ... There were only three positive reviews, but they were quite important. I list the names: Linde, Schröter, Zeuner...

— Rudolf Diesel (Note: Die Veröffentlichung meiner Broschüre löste heftige Kritiken, ... aus, die durchschnittlich sehr ungünstig, ja eigentlich vernichtend ausfielen ... Günstig waren nur drei Stimmen, diese aber von Gewicht. Ich nenne die Namen: Linde, Schröter, Zeuner... — Rudolf Diesel in Sittauer 1990. p 70)

[In terms of negative reviews], I consider only Professor Riedler′s and [Züblin′s] review relevant.

— Rudolf Diesel (Note: Eine einzige Kritik habe ich für bedeutungsvoll gehalten, sie stammt von Prof. Riedler und den Ingenieuren von Gebr. Sulzer — Rudolf Diesel in Sass 1962. p 398)

Wilhelm Züblin, engineer of Sulzer, and Professor Alois Riedler came to the conclusion that Diesel's motor could require so much compression work that it could possibly not perform any useful work. In his 1887 work Theorie der Gasmotoren, Otto Köhler had already addressed that an ideal cycle is not suitable for a real motor, coming to the same conclusion as the former. He had foreseen the problem of friction loss rendering the motor work useless (Note: German: [Köhler beweist], „daß sich der vollkommene Kreisproceß, abgesehen von der Schwierigkeit, ihn genau durchzuführen, für die Praxis nicht eignet. Zwar ist ein hoher Nutzeffect erreichbar; dann steigen aber die Anfangspressungen so bedeutend und der mittlere wirksame Druck bleibt trotzdem so klein, daß die Dimensionen ungeheure werden würden und der Gewinn wieder durch die großen Reibungsverluste aufgezehrt würde.“ — Otto Köhler, Theorie der Gasmotoren, 1887. in Sass 1962. p 399 English translation: [Köhler proves in his 1887 work] that the ideal Carnot cycle is not suitable for real engines, not mentioning the fact that using it will be considerably difficult. Though it is possible to achieve a high efficiency, the initial increase in cylinder pressure will be so high and effective mean pressure will be so low that the engine would be in such a terrific state that the friction loss would consume all the work performed.) and, in a letter addressed to Diesel's friend Venator, he considered the pressure required too high:

Furthermore, I consider creating a heat motor, using the Carnot cycle and air, unfeasible. The enormous piston pressure, which requires a very huge transmission, cannot be avoided. And at this point, I am not mentioning the problems the process itself would cause in the first place. (...) In my opinion, the entire indicated work of Diesel′s motor will be required to overcome the enormous friction.

— Otto Köhler (Note: Übrigens halte ich auch eine Wärmekraftmaschine, welche nach dem Carnot′schen Prozeß mit Luft arbeitet, für unmöglich. Die riesigen Kolbendrücke lassen sich nicht umgehen und beanspruchen ein Getriebe von ganz gewaltigen Abmessungen. Hierbei sehe ich von den Schwierigkeiten, den Proceß genau duchzuführen, ganz ab. (...) Ich bin der Meinung, daß die ganze indicirte Leistung der Dieselschen vollkommenen Maschine zur Überwindung der unbedingt auftretenden großen Reibungswiderstände verwandt wird. — Otto Köhler in Sass 1962. p 400)

Other critics rather feared that the material would not withstand the enormous strain, but otherwise did not criticise the mistake of Diesel's theory:

I hope you will not resent me, but having a lot of practical experience, I have serious doubts regarding the creation of an actual engine based on these theories. Nobody has ever gathered experience building a motor capable of 300 RPM, sustaining over 200 atmospheres of pressure, and consuming and combusting solid fuel in very little time, and I believe that I am not wrong, if I suppose that this experience will be a huge disappointment.

— Eugen Langen (Note: Sie werden es mir aber nicht verargen, wenn ich als erfahrener Praktiker erhebliehe Bedenken bezüglich der Ausführungs- und Dürchführungs-Fähigkeit dieser Anschauungen habe. - Erfahrungen mit Maschinen, welche 300 Touren machen, uber 200 Atmosphären Spannung beherbergen, dabei in kaum meßbar kurzer Zeit festes Brennmaterial aufnehmen und consumiren sollen, sind überhaupt nicht gemacht, und ich glaube nicht zu irren, wenn ich annehme, daß diese Erfahrungen mit einer ganz gewaltigen Enttäuschung verknüpft sein werden ... — Eugen Langen in Sittauer 1990. p 71–72)

Others praised Diesel and the theory:

... I wish you that you will succeed ... bringing a well-engineered product to market, carefully made in silence, and dislodging the steam engine from its throne at the end of the century it assumed it! Nobody who predicted the fall of the steam engine has ever been as radical as you are, hence, the victory shall be yours...

— Moritz Schröter (Note: ... ich möchte wünschen, daß es Ihnen gelingt ... mit einer in der Stille durchgearbeiteten, technisch fertigen Sache auf den Markt zu treten und am Ende des Jahrhunderts die Dampfmaschine zu entthronen, welche der Anfang desselben auf den Thron erhoben hat! So radikal und kühn ist noch keiner von denen, welche der Dampfmaschine den Untergang prophezeihen, vorgegangen wie Sie und solchem Muth gebührt der Sieg ... Moritz Schröter in Sittauer 1990. p 70)

Considering how inferior burning coal in the steam engine and burning gas in the gas engine are, how hard it was to reach the modern level of engine efficiency, and how little chance there is left that on the current way anything significant can still be reached, leaving this way is something that has to be done and a new path has to be struck.

— Mortiz Schröter (Note: Bedenkt man ... , in welcher die mangelhafte Ausnutzung der Kohle in der Dampfmaschine und des Leuchtgases im Gasmotor dargelegt wird, wie mühsam Schritt für Schritt der heutige Zustand unserer besten Wärmemotoren erkimpft wurde und wie wenig Aussicht vorhanden ist, daß auf dem bisherigen Weg noch erheblich mehr erreicht werden kann, so scheint in der That der Schluß zwingend zu sein, daß dieser Weg verlassen werden muß und neue Bahnen einzuschlagen sind ... Mortiz Schröter in Sittauer 1990. p 72)

The path that we may hope will lead us closer than ever before towards the ideal Carnot cycle has been predetermined with both serenity and thoughtfulness as well as daringness and authenticity in its accomplishment.

— Mortiz Schröter (Note: mit ebenso viel Klarheit und Besonnenheit in der wissenschaftlichen Grundlage, wie Kühnheit und Originalität in der praktischen Durchführung der Weg vorgezeichnet ist, auf welchem wir hoffen dürfen, dem Ideal des Carnotschen Prozesses ganz beträchtlich näher zu kommen, als es bisher möglich war ... Mortiz Schröter in Sittauer 1990. p 72)

Seen from the perspective of the plain theory, I am on your side and I appreciate your proposal of a new heat motor; I have not read anything in a long while regarding our discipline that I have been this interested in. Your basic theories are both new and correct.

— Gustav Zeuner (Note: Theoretisch stelle ich mich auf ihre Seite und freue mich außerordentlich über Ihre Anregung; ich habe lange nichts gelesen, was mich in unserem Fache so sehr interessiert hätte. Ihre beiden Grundgedanken sind durchaus neu und richtig ... Gustav Zeuner in Sittauer 1990. p 70)

Despite not judging the technical value of Diesel′s motor yet, as it has not yet been built, it has to be admitted that it shall give internal combustion engine design the right direction towards heat engine perfection. Furthermore, the engineer will have a satisfying task purposely designing the new motor for industrial applications, both small and huge in their dimensions, as well as for locomotives and ships. Not depending on steam, compressed air, electricity and gas pipes, not requiring any boiler, chimney and fueling coal, and not causing smoky exhaust, but using the fuel very efficiently, will obviously have an impact on the machine building and transport industry. The high scientific, technical and economical importance of Diesel′s rational heat motor will sure boost its development...

— Max Friedrich Gutermuth (Note: Bei aller Zurückhaltlung des Urteils über den technisehen Wert des Dieselschen Motors, wegen der noch mangelnden praktischen Ausführung, muß doch jetzt schon zugegeben werden, daß er berufen ist, dem Motorenbau jene Richtung zu geben, welche zur technischen Vollkommenheit der Wärmekraftmaschine führt. Außerdem eröffnet die zweckentsprechende Durchbildung des neuen Motors für die verschiedenen Anforderungen der Groß- und Kleinbetriebe sowie der Lokomotiven und Schiffe dem Ingenieur eine vielseitige fruchtbringende Thätigkeit. Die vollkommene Selbständigkeit des Motors, unabhängig von Dampf-, Druckluft-, Elektrizitäts- oder Gasleitungen, der Wegfall des Kessels und Schornsteines, der Feuerung und Rauchbelästigung, in Verbindung mit der weitgehendsten Brennstofausnutzung werden notwendigerweise auch umgestaltenden Einfluß auf alle mit dem Maschinenbetrieb zusammenhängenden Industrie und Verkehrsverhältnisse nehmen. - Die hohe wissenschaftliche, technische und wirtschaftliche Bedeutung des Dieselschen rationellen Wärmemotors wird seine praktische Entwicklung gewiß beschleunigen...|Max Friedrich Gutermuth in Sittauer 1990. p 72–73)

Your machine yet again attacks the mighty steam engine by outperforming it in its efficiency. The technology once has to come to the point where it gets rid of the long known flaws of its old steam engine.

— Franz Reuleaux (Note: ... Ihre Maschine führt abermals einen Stoß gegen die mächtige Dampfmaschine, indem Sie deren Wärmeausnutzung übertrifft. Einmal muß die Technik dahinkommen, den so lange erkannten Mangel ihrer alten Dampfmaschine zu beseitigen ... Franz Reuleaux in Sittauer 1990. p 70)

=== Diesel realising his theory′s flaw ===
As Diesel considered Riedler's and Züblin's reactions to his essay relevant, he tried addressing their point that the engine would not perform any useful work. In a letter addressed to Moritz Schröter, dated 13 February 1893, Diesel describes the thermal efficiency of his rational heat motor, assuming maximum losses. He comes to the conclusion that the absolute minimum thermal efficiency is not less than 30.4–31.6 %, which is still more than 2½ times the thermal efficiency of a triple expansion steam engine and 4–5 times the thermal efficiency of a medium size compound steam engine. At this time, Diesel had not yet realised that his rational heat motor would not work: Still trying to figure how to further increase efficiency, he considered increasing the admission period's length by increasing the supposed isotherm length on his motor's ideal diagram, which Diesel believed would result in better efficiency. What he did not understand at the time was that his diagram did not show an isotherm. With an actual isotherm, the amount of input work would have been almost greater than the output work, resulting in a narrow p-V diagram, indicating that the rational heat motor would not perform any work.

It took Diesel several months to figure the problem. He started designing a new combustion process in May 1893 titled „Schlußfolgerungen über die definitiv f. d. Praxis zu wählende Arbeitsmethode des Motors“ (conclusion of the operating principle that definitely has to be chosen for a practical engine); it took until September the same year. By 16 June 1893, before he started the experiments with his engine at the Maschinenfabrik Augsburg, he had realised that the Carnot cycle is practically not possible and that he, therefore, has to change the way his motor works: ″Despite my older contrary statement, the question has to be answered, whether or not combustion processes other than the isothermal process would result in a bigger diagram″ (=actual engine work). Thus, Diesel eventually abandoned his idea of isothermic-adiabatic compression, he later made a note in his journal: ″We must not compress the air in a combined isothermal-adiabatic way, instead, we must only compress it adiabatically″.

To achieve this, Diesel now wanted to raise point 3 in his diagram instead of increasing the length of the admission period 2–3 by reducing injection time. Diesel, who had obtained a patent (DRP 67 207) for a combustion process without significant changes in either pressure or temperature, thought that this patent would also cover constant pressure combustion curves, but to ensure that the changes in his combustion process would also be covered by a patent, he applied for a new additional patent on 29 November 1893, which was later awarded to him (DRP 82 168). Yet again, Diesel made a mistake: Instead of injecting the fuel faster, injecting more fuel would have been the correct solution in this case. When making calculations for a modification of his test engine in September 1893, he compared his test engine with a regular paraffin engine: ″Average paraffin engines have a fuel consumption of approximately 600 g/PSh = 750 cm^{3}/PSh paraffin, thus 7,500 cm^{3} for 10 PSh. We would have to assume the same quantity of fuel for our engine running at maximum load and 150×60=9000 injections per hour.″ This is how Diesel found out that he has to use an air-fuel ratio of ~14:1 rather than ~100:1 for a working engine. Furthermore, Diesel finally decided to abandon his concept of a high compression pressure in favour of a lower pressure of 30 atm (3 MPa) more suitable for 1890s machines. Correctly, he assumed that lower compression, despite causing less thermal efficiency, would result in less friction, which would allow an engine having a higher total efficiency, than an engine with a greater thermal efficiency but more friction losses:

The actual efficiency has a maximum in between 30 and 40 atmospheres and 500 and 600°. Higher compression is useless, because the additional thermal efficiency is rendered useless by loss of mechanical efficiency and because the specific power output decreases with increasing compression due to the high friction losses.

— Rudolf Diesel, summer 1893 (Note: Der wirtschaftliche Wirkungsgrad ist ein Maximum bei Kompressionen zwischen 30 und 40 Atmosphären und 500 und 600°. Höhere Kompressionen als diese nützen nichts, weil der Gewinn am thermischen Wirkungsgrad durch den Verlust am mechanischen aufgewogen wird und weil die Raumleistungen bei höherer Kompression infolge der großen Reibungsverluste wieder abnehmen. — Rudolf Diesel in Sittauer 1990. p 79)

Publicly, Diesel never admitted his mistakes, despite knowing them and how to overcome them. He did so to save his patent: Publicly admitting that the rational heat motor cannot work would have rendered his patent DRP 67 207 obsolete and therefore destroyed his personal work, because it would have allowed building the Diesel engine without acquiring a licence for his patent.

== Deviation from the process ==
Diesel feared that possible licencees could get an ″unfavourable impression″ when seeing the high compression pressure figure. Therefore, Diesel addressed several different deviations from the ideal process in chapters 3 and 5 of his essay. By gradually reducing compression temperature, he depicted a gradual reduction in compression pressure. He writes that a pressure reduction from 250 atm (25.3 MPa) to 90 atm (9.1 MPa) would only result in 5% thermal efficiency loss, but an increase in overall efficiency, which is why Diesel figured that there ″cannot be any doubts that the deviating process has to be chosen for the actual motor″. The lowest pressure Diesel considered reasonable is 44 atm (4.5 MPa), resulting in a thermal efficiency of 60%. According to Diesel, at the time materials were already capable of withstanding such high pressure. He also admitted that a pressure of approximately 30 atm (3 MPa) may be used as a last stop-gap solution if higher compression is not possible. During his experiments in Augsburg, Diesel ended up finding out that the ideal compression for the engine is in between 30 and 35 atm (3–3.5 MPa), after he first considered slightly higher values of 30–40 atm (3–4.1 MPa) reasonable. When reducing the compression pressure, Diesel always tried keeping it above the self-ignition temperature of the fuel, which is why he eventually decided to choose 30 atm.

== Applications of the motor ==
In the eighth chapter, Diesel gives five suggestions how his motor can be used as:

- Stationary motor for large-scale industry
- Stationary motor for small-scale industry
- Motor for locomotives
- Motor for trams and lorries
- Motor for watercraft

Hellmut Droscha evaluates in the 1991 book Leistung und Weg: Zur Geschichte des MAN-Nutzfahrzeugbaus that Diesel's main intention was designing a motor for small-scale industry. With a Diesel engine, according to Droscha, Diesel thought he could improve the competitiveness of small enterprises. In the 19th century, only larger firms could afford steam engines, as steam engines were economical in bigger quantities only.

== Bibliography ==
- Diesel, Rudolf Christian Karl (2013) [1893], Theorie und Konstruktion eines rationellen Wärmemotors zum Ersatz der Dampfmaschine und der heute bekannten Verbrennungsmotoren (in German), Berlin: Springer, doi:10.1007/978-3-642-64949-3, ISBN 978-3-642-64941-7
- Diesel, Rudolf Christian Karl (2010) [1913], Die Entstehung des Dieselmotors (in German), Berlin: Springer, doi:10.1007/978-3-642-64948-6, ISBN 978-3-642-64940-0
- Droscha, Hellmut (1991), MAN AG (ed.), Leistung und Weg: Zur Geschichte des MAN-Nutzfahrzeugbaus (in German), Berlin: Springer, ISBN 978-3-642-93491-9
- Sass, Friedrich (1962), Geschichte des deutschen Verbrennungsmotorenbaus von 1860 bis 1918 (in German), Berlin/Heidelberg: Springer, ISBN 978-3-662-11843-6
- Sittauer, Hans L. (1990), Nicolaus August Otto Rudolf Diesel, Biographien hervorragender Naturwissenschaftler, Techniker und Mediziner (in German), vol. 32 (4th ed.), Leipzig, DDR: Springer (BSB Teubner), ISBN 978-3-322-00762-9
