= Chestnut Hill Reservoir Historic District =

Historic district in Massachusetts, United States

Coordinates: 42°20′6.30″N 71°9′30.52″W

- U.S. National Register of Historic Places
- U.S. Historic district
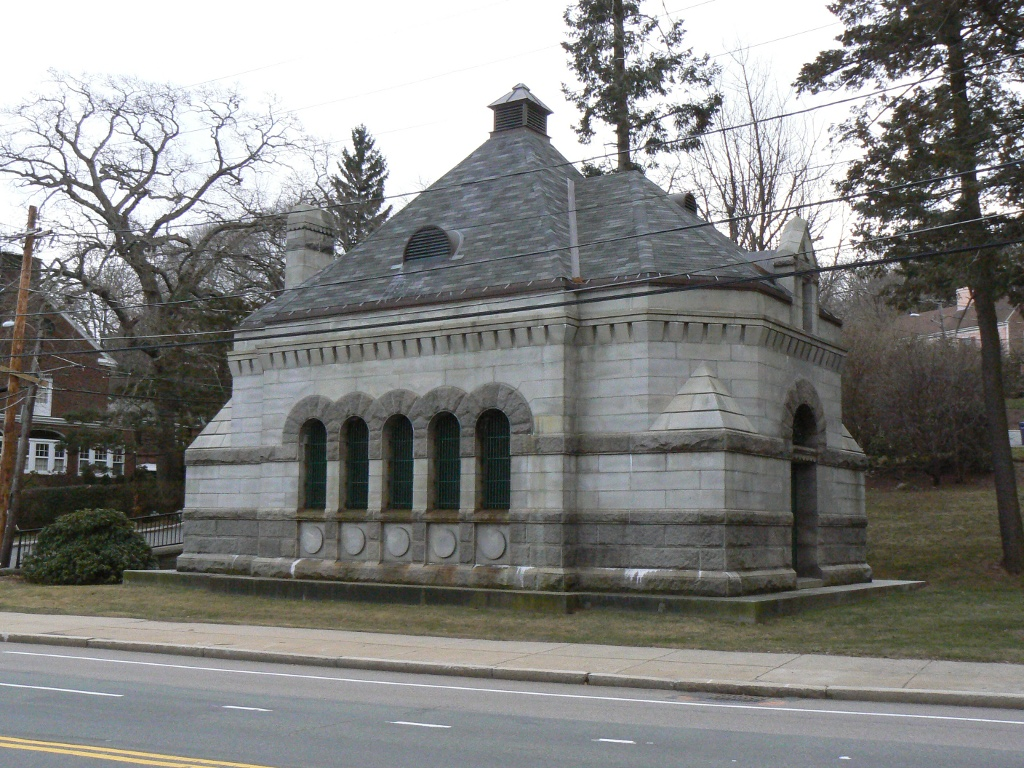
- The gatehouse at the end of the Sudbury Aqueduct, a contributing structure to the district

- Location within Massachusetts Location within the United States
- Location: between Beacon Street and Commonwealth Avenue, Boston, Massachusetts; extends into Newton
- Area: 95 acres (38 ha)
- NRHP reference No.: 89002271
- Added to NRHP: January 18, 1990

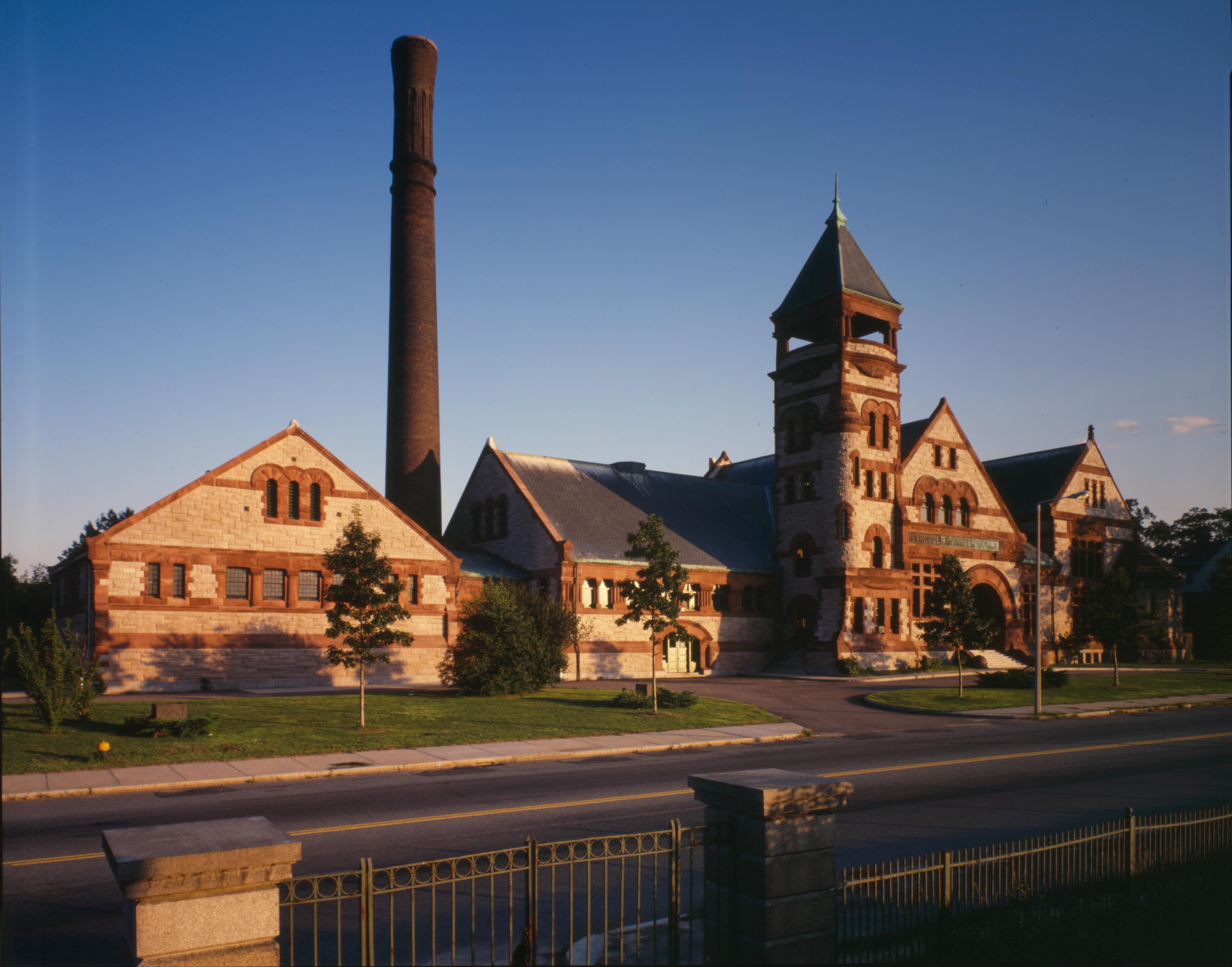
Chestnut Hill High Service Pumping Station

The Chestnut Hill Reservoir Historic District is a historic district encompassing the Chestnut Hill Reservoir and the surrounding water works facilities which were historically used to provide fresh water to Boston, Massachusetts, and surrounding towns. The district is nearly coextensive with the Chestnut Hill Reservation, a state park managed by the Massachusetts Department of Conservation and Recreation (DCR); those elements of the water works that are still required as an emergency backup are managed by the Massachusetts Water Resources Authority (MWRA). The reservoir is located between Beacon Street and Commonwealth Avenue in Boston's Chestnut Hill district, just east of the Boston College Main Campus Historic District.

The Chestnut Hill Reservoir was built between 1865 and 1870 to supplement the capacity of the Brookline Reservoir, which was then the terminus of the Cochituate Aqueduct. The Sudbury Aqueduct was completed in 1878, providing water to the reservoir from the Sudbury River in Boston's western suburbs. Its terminal chamber, a single-story granite Romanesque structure with a hip roof, stands across Beacon Street from the reservoir, and houses gates for controlling flow into the reservoir from both the Cochituate Aqueduct (now defunct) and the Sudbury Aqueduct (in backup service), and from the reservoir to the Brookline Reservoir. The other major structure in the district is the high service pumping station, a massive Romanesque structure designed by Arthur Vinal in 1887, which is now a museum.

The Chestnut Hill Reservoir and pumping stations were designated a Boston Landmark by the Boston Landmarks Commission in 1989.

== See also ==
- Chestnut Hill Reservoir
- Chestnut Hill Reservation
- National Register of Historic Places listings in southern Boston, Massachusetts
- National Register of Historic Places listings in Newton, Massachusetts
- Leavitt-Riedler Pumping Engine
