= Waltham Water Works Shop =

- U.S. National Register of Historic Places
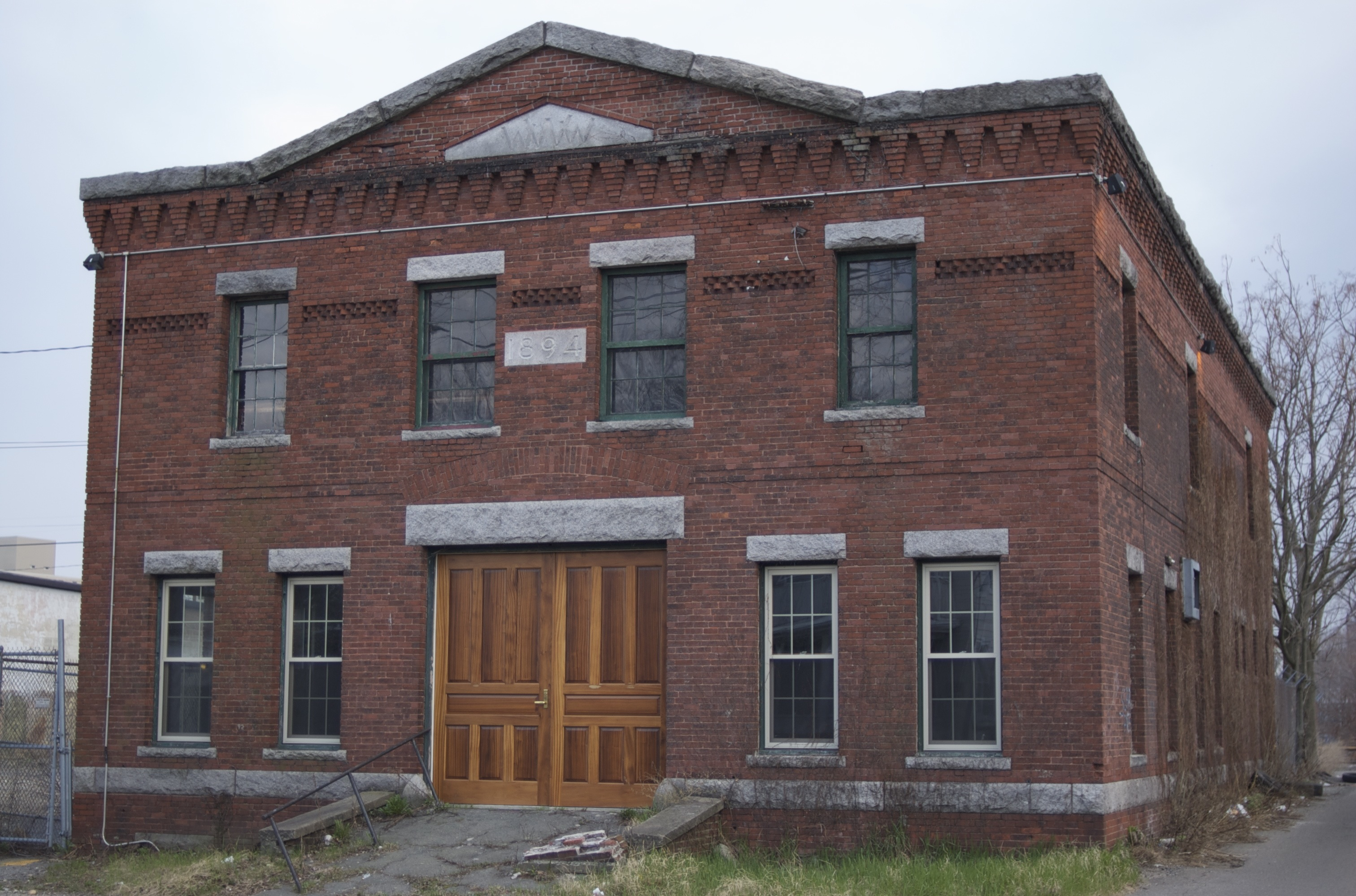

- Location within Massachusetts Location within the United States
- Location: 92 Felton St., Waltham, Massachusetts
- Coordinates: 42°22′24″N 71°14′28″W
- Built: 1894
- Architect: L.C. Abbott
- MPS: Waltham MRA
- NRHP reference No.: 89001570
- Added to NRHP: September 28, 1989

The Waltham Water Works Shop is a historic municipal public works building at 92 Felton Street in Waltham, Massachusetts, United States. The two story brick building was built in 1894, as part of a major municipal construction campaign. It is distinctive as a well-preserved yet utilitarian municipal structure, whose construction embodies some significant advances for the period. Its basement level, which originally housed a workshop, had a cement floor and was illuminated by both gas and electrical fixtures, all then somewhat advanced features. The main floor, which housed offices, space for carriages, and stalls for six horses, was constructed of concrete and iron. The upper floor housed storage as well as hay and fodder for the stabled horses.

By the 1980s the building had been readapted by the city for use as a dog pound. The building was listed on the National Register of Historic Places in 1989.

== See also ==
- National Register of Historic Places listings in Waltham, Massachusetts
- Metropolitan Waterworks Museum in Boston
