= Fisher Hill Reservoir =

- Fisher Hill Reservoir and Gatehouse
- U.S. National Register of Historic Places
- U.S. Historic district – Contributing property
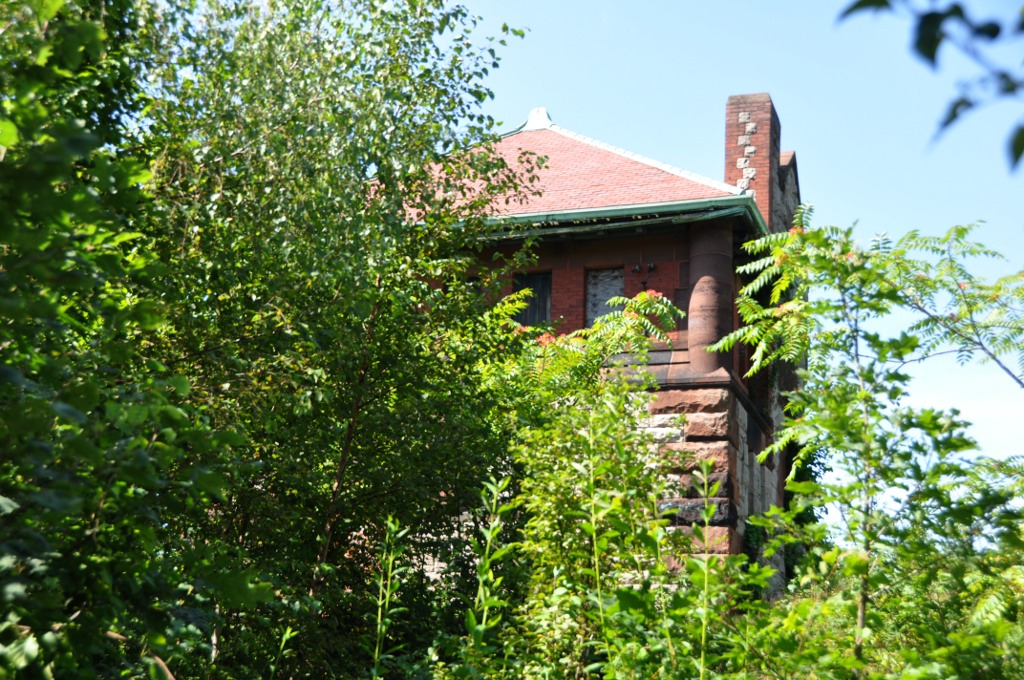
- Overgrown view in 2011

- Location within Massachusetts Location within the United States
- Location: Fisher Rd. between Hyslop and Channing Rds., Brookline, Massachusetts
- Coordinates: 42°19′45″N 71°8′37″W
- Area: 4 acres (1.6 ha)
- Built: 1887
- Architect: Multiple
- Architectural style: Romanesque, Richardsonian Romanesque
- Part of: Fisher Hill Historic District (ID85003266)
- MPS: Water Supply System of Metropolitan Boston MPS
- NRHP reference No.: 89002254

Significant dates
- Added to NRHP: January 18, 1990
- Designated CP: October 17, 1985

The Fisher Hill Reservoir and Gatehouse are historic elements of the public water supply for the Greater Boston area.

== History ==
The reservoir was located on Fisher Avenue between Hyslop and Channing Roads in Brookline, Massachusetts, and is now the site of Fisher Hill Reservoir Park. It was built in 1886-87 as an early component of the Boston Water Board's expansion of its high service system. The gatehouse may have been designed by Arthur Vinal, who also designed the Chestnut Hill pumping station at the Chestnut Hill Reservoir.

It is a two-story Richardsonian Romanesque structure, with its first floor finished in stone and its second in brick. Brownstone trim is used on the windows and corner quoins, and the voussoirs which form the arches on the first floor. There are pipes to the reservoir and down to Chestnut Hill, and gates for controlling access to local the distribution network. The building was taken out of service in the 1950s.

The reservoir and gatehouse were listed on the National Register of Historic Places in 1990. In 2013, the town acquired the property from the state, and has since converted it into a public park, filling in the reservoir. The gatehouse survives, and there is interpretive signage explaining the historical use of the property.

== See also ==
- National Register of Historic Places listings in Brookline, Massachusetts
