= Metropolitan Waterworks Museum =

Museum in Chestnut Hill, Massachusetts

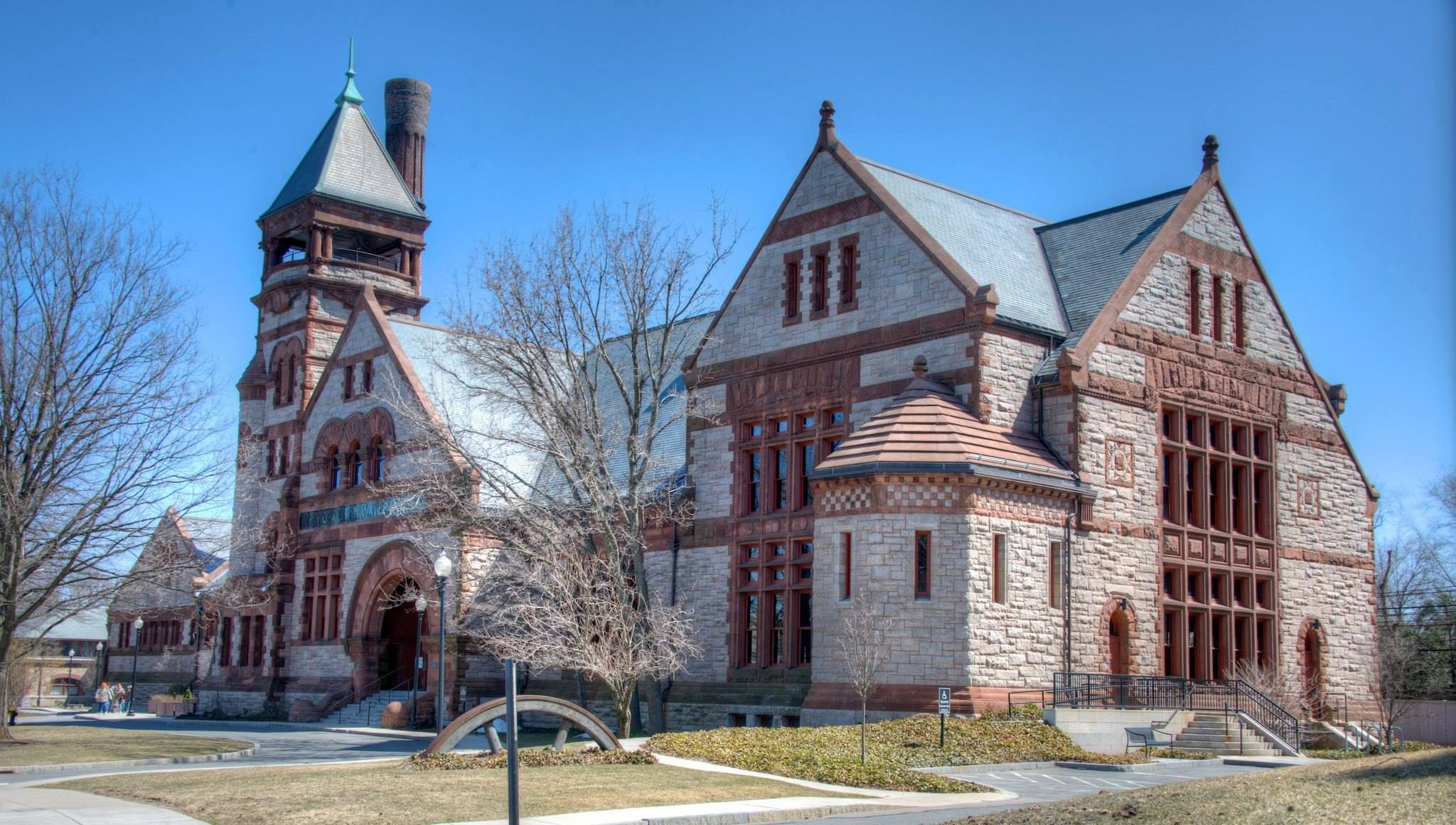
- Director: Kevin Carlon
- Chairperson: Katherine Burton Jones
- Owner: Metropolitan Waterworks Museum Inc.
- Public transit access: Green Line (D branch) Reservoir or Chestnut Hill
- Website: waterworksmuseum.org
- Interactive map highlighting the location of the museum
- Location: 2450 Beacon Street, Chestnut Hill, Massachusetts, US
- Coordinates: 42°19′54″N 71°09′20″W
- Architect: Arthur H. Vinal
- Architectural style: Richardsonian Romanesque

U.S. Historic district – Contributing property
- Official name: Chestnut Hill High Service Pumping Station
- Designated: January 18, 1990
- Part of: Chestnut Hill Reservoir Historic District
- Reference no.: 89002271

The Waterworks Museum is a museum in the Chestnut Hill Waterworks building, originally a high-service pumping station of the Boston Metropolitan Waterworks. It contains well-preserved mechanical engineering devices in a Richardsonian Romanesque building.

During its busiest years, the waterworks pumped as much as a hundred million gallons of water each day. The station was decommissioned in the 1970s, and later some of its buildings were turned into condominiums. After a period of disuse, the pumping station was restored, and in 2007 the Waterworks Preservation Trust was set up to oversee its conversion into a museum. In March 2011, the building reopened to the public as the Waterworks Museum.

== History ==
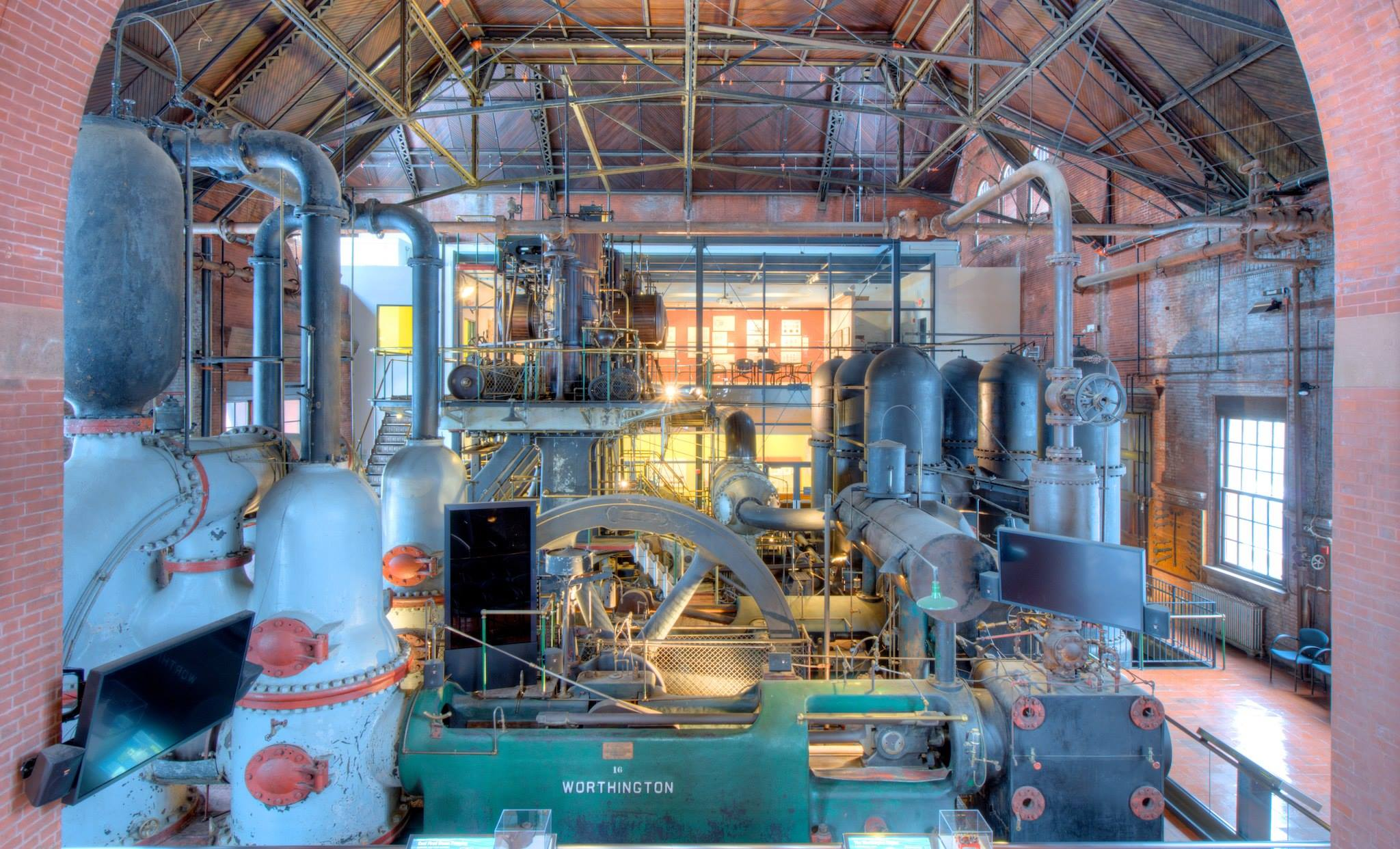
The pumping station’s Leavitt and Worthington Engines

In the 1850s, Boston began modernizing its water supply, which at the time was a combination of wells, pond water, and downhill piping from a Natick reservoir.

In the 1870s, Boston city leaders decided the city needed to scale up its water filtration and pumping, and began looking into options.

In 1886, this 'high service' pumping station was designed, and the next year it came online as the Chestnut Hill pumping station - only a few years after the first such station in the world, in Germany. Water was pumped from this station uphill to the Fisher Hill reservoir, where gravity would then push the water to the surrounding area.

In 1894, the station put its third water pump into operation: a steam-powered water pump designed by Erasmus Darwin Leavitt. The Leavitt-Riedler Pumping Engine, as it was later called, was promoted as "the most efficient pumping engine in the world" it was first unveiled, and remained in operation through 1928. In the 20th century it was declared a historic mechanical engineering landmark by the American Society of Mechanical Engineers. It was fully restored by the museum and is the centerpiece of its main floor.

=== Trivia ===
Mark Wahlberg filmed part of his 1992 "You Gotta Believe" in the basement of the building.

The building contains the stonework faces of its designer, Arthur H. Vinal, and his wife.

== See also ==
- Chestnut Hill Reservoir Historic District
- Leavitt-Riedler Pumping Engine
- Waltham Water Works Shop
