= Leavitt-Riedler Pumping Engine =

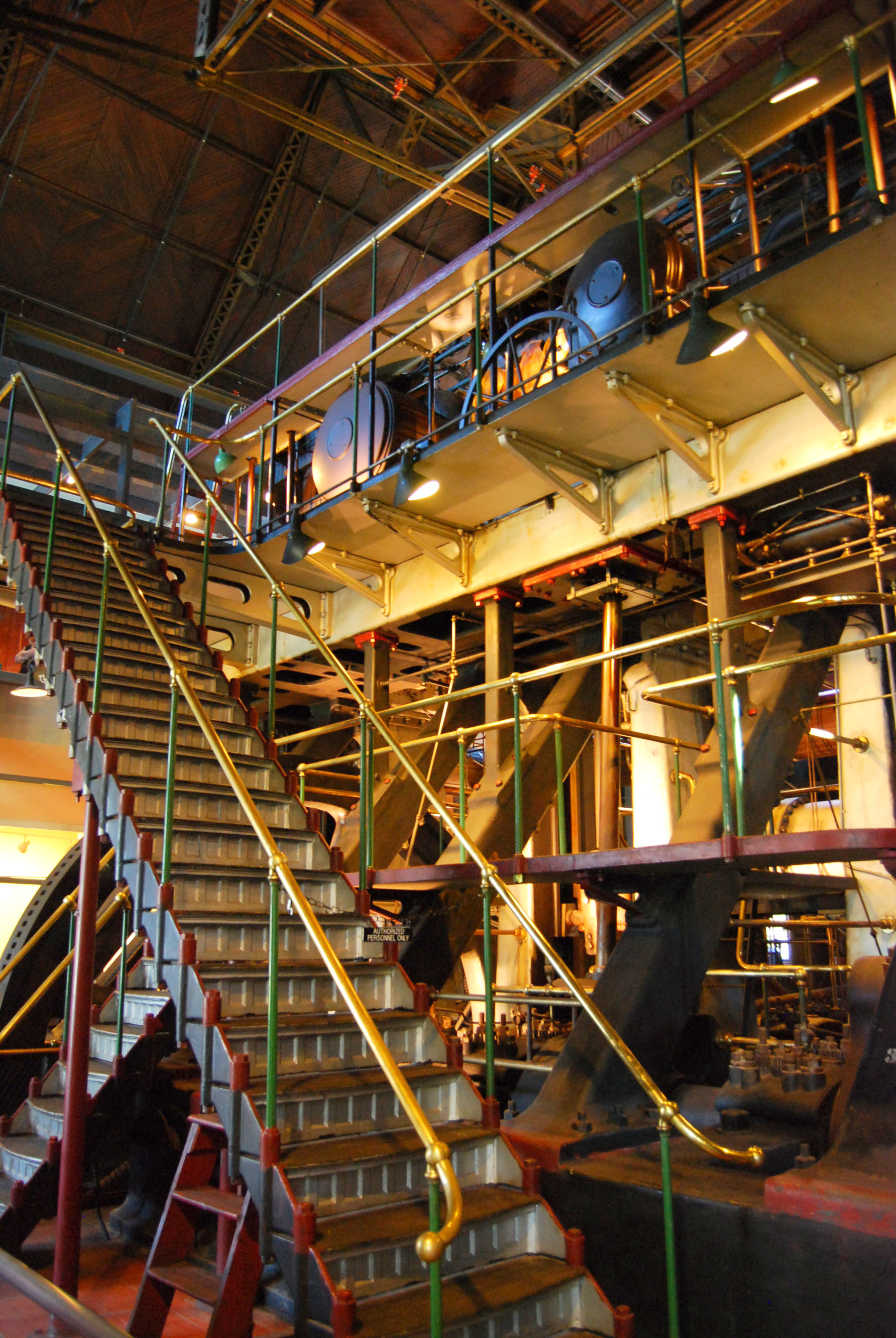
Leavitt-Riedler Pumping Engine

The Leavitt-Riedler Pumping Engine (1894) is a historic steam engine located in the former Chestnut Hill High Service Pumping Station, in Boston, Massachusetts. It has been declared a historic mechanical engineering landmark by the American Society of Mechanical Engineers. The pumping station was decommissioned in the 1970s, and turned into the Metropolitan Waterworks Museum in 2011.

The engine drew steam from a coal-fired boiler, and had a pump valve mechanism which allowed its high-speed operation at a hydraulic head of 128 feet (39 m).

The engine was designed by engineer Erasmus Darwin Leavitt, Jr., of Cambridge, Massachusetts, with a pump valve invented by Prof. Alois Riedler of the Technische Hochschule in Berlin (now Technische Universität Berlin), Germany. It was built by N. F. Palmer Jr. & Co. and the Quintard Iron Works, in New York.

In 1894, it was installed as Engine No. 3 of the Chestnut Hill High Station, later named the Boston Water Works. At its normal speed of 50 revolutions per minute, it pumped 25 million gallons of water in 24 hours. According to Carol Poh Miller, when first brought into operation, the engine attracted national attention as "the most efficient pumping engine in the world".

The engine was taken out of service in 1928 but remains in its original location and it is open for public viewing as an exhibit in the Metropolitan Waterworks Museum.

== Components and operation ==
The engine itself is of an unusual triple-expansion, three-crank rocker design, with pistons 13.7, 24.375, and 39 inches (348.0, 619.1, and 990.6 mm) in diameter and 6-foot (1.8 m) stroke. Each rocker is connected both to a crankshaft with a 15-foot (4.6 m) flywheel and to a double acting pump's plunger.

The triple-expansion steam engine cylinders, located on the second story of the engine, are supported by six vertical and six diagonal columns, creating space for three vertical pistons to move up and down. The vertical rods with 6-foot (1.8 m) stroke from the engine drive a horizontal crankshaft which is also connected to a flywheel. Each of the vertical rods is also connected to the back end of a rocking crank, similar to a bellcrank. With the pivot point of the crank in the front side, the up and down motion of the vertical rod on the back end of the crank creates a motion that pulls and pushes the crank backward and forward. There are also three horizontal rods that connect between the horizontal shaft and the cranks. As the shaft turns, the rods move backward and forward nearly horizontally, adding force to the backward and forward motion of the cranks.

On the front end of the cranks, there are 30-degree inclined rods that are connected to the inclined plungers of the pump proper. The unusual diagonal plungers were created in part by the limitation of the existing engine room. The crank configuration is set in a way that the 6-foot (1.8 m) stroke is reduced to 4-foot (1.2 m) stroke for the inclined rods. Each plunger pumps water in two pump chambers with total of six chambers for the pumping engine. With the reduction of the strokes and the relation of diameters, a higher capacity for pressure can be achieved. The efficiency of the engine also comes from the design of the pump valves by Prof. Riedler. The pump valves which are connected rings that can move up and down to open and close the valves. The pump valve mechanism is controlled by a diagonal rod, powered from a 12-foot (3.7 m) stroke horizontal rod which is connected the crank. The valve rods only close the valves on the reverse stroke and leave the valves free to open automatically to increase the speed of the operation.

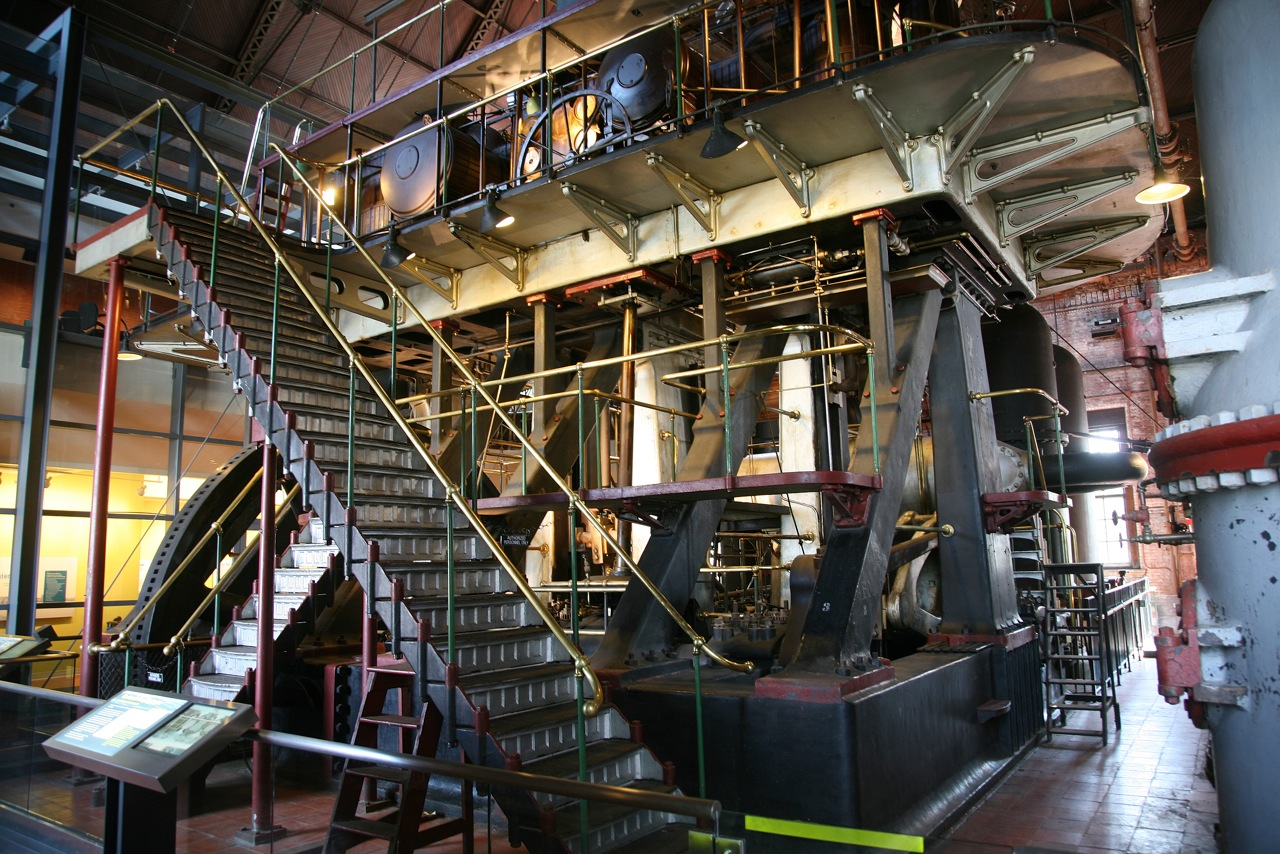
Overview of the engine

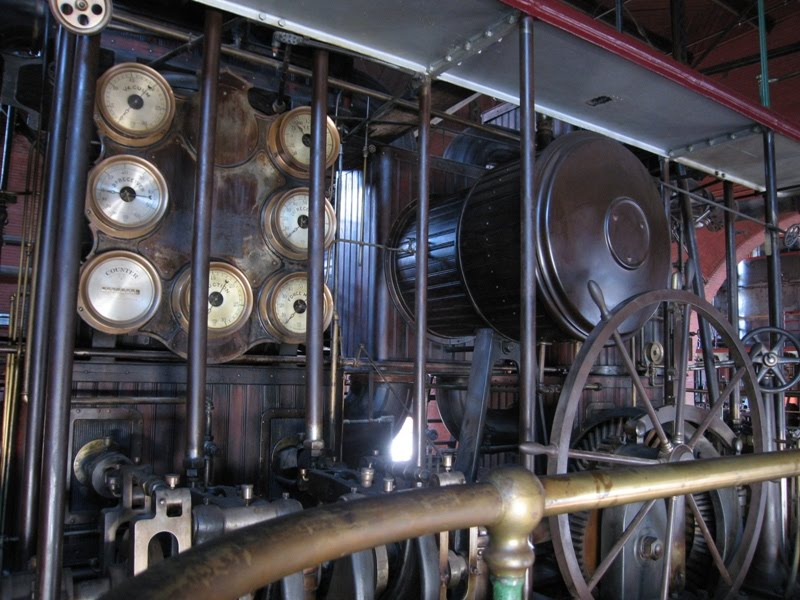
Steam engine and pressure gauges on the second story

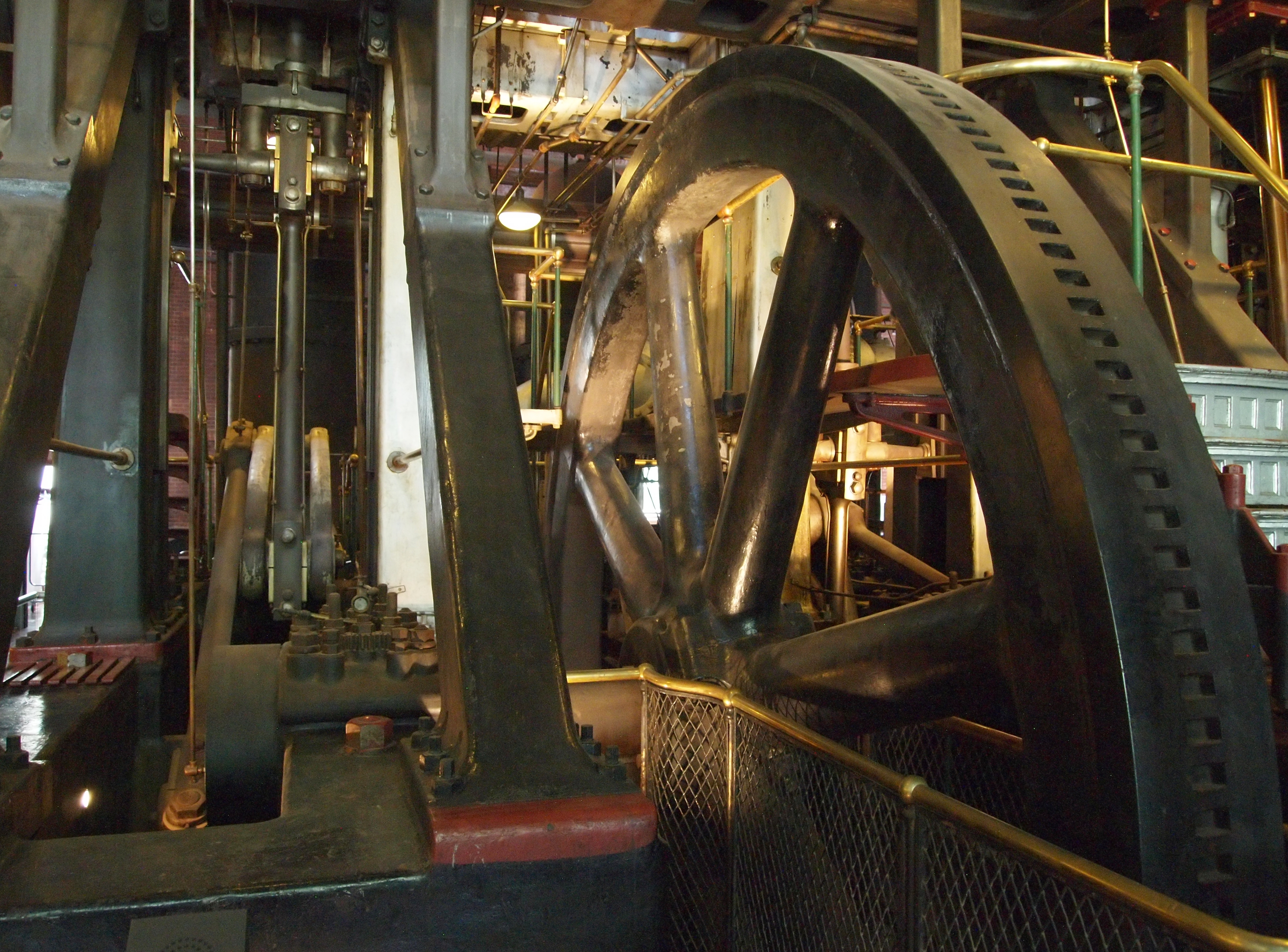
Flywheel and a vertical rod. A horizontal rod is on the left. A crank is between the two rods.

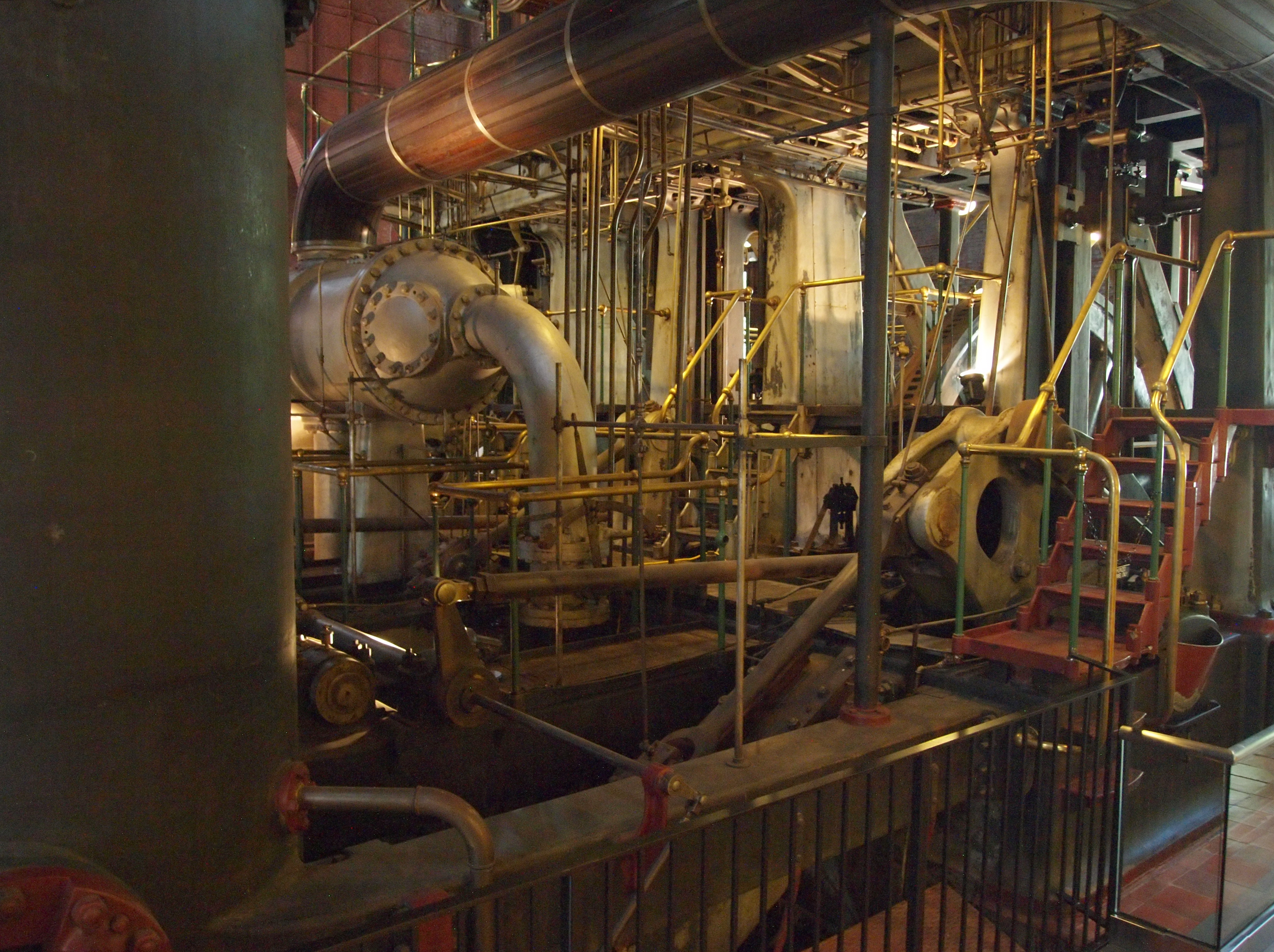
An inclined rod of the pump plunger connected to the crank next to the red stairs

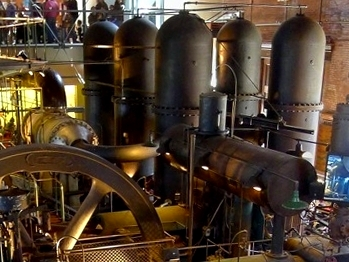
Six pump chambers. Two chambers for each of the three pump plungers.

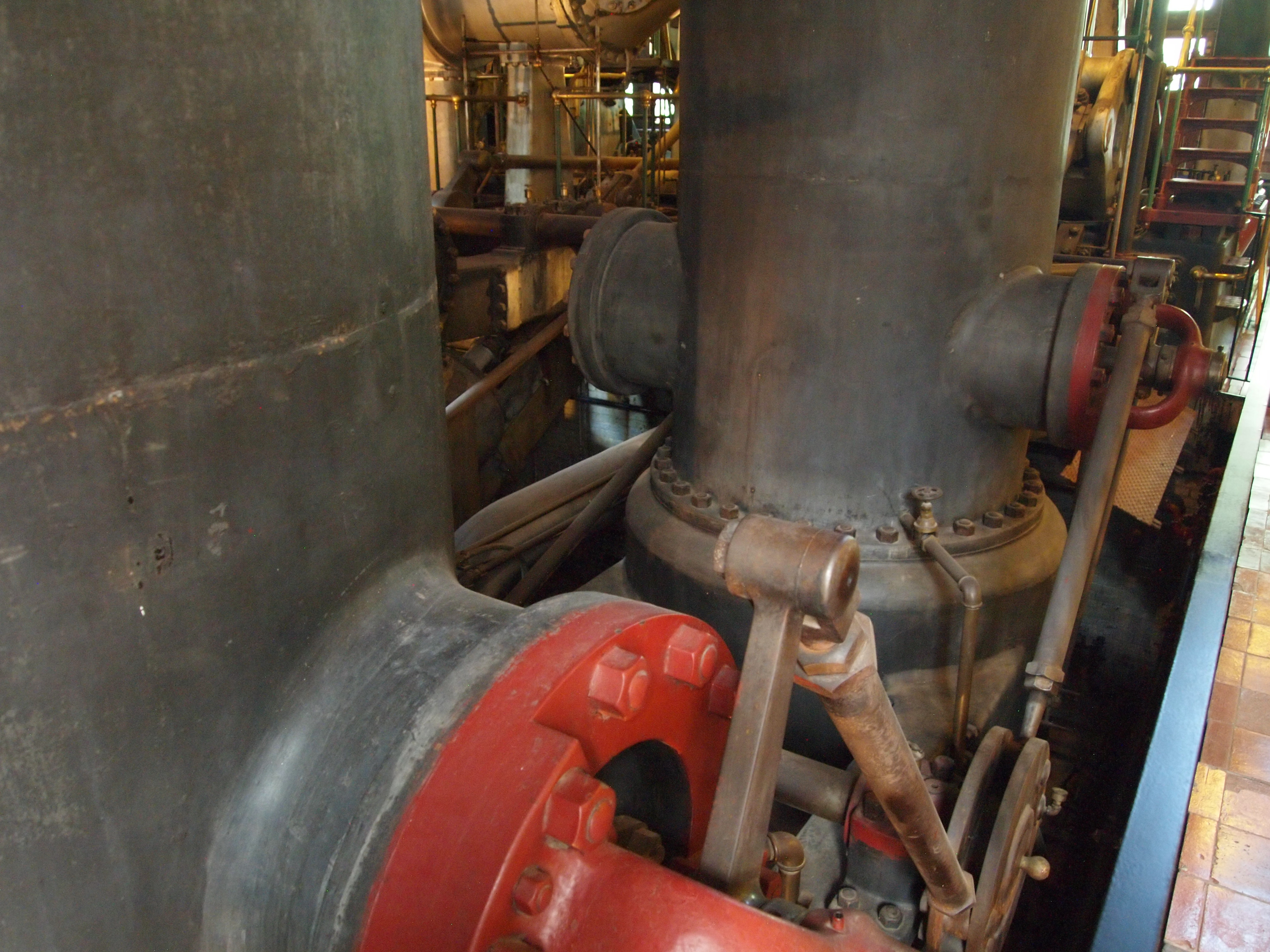
Pump valve mechanism

== See also ==
- List of historic mechanical engineering landmarks
