= Erasmus Darwin Leavitt Jr. =

American mechanical engineer (1836–1916)

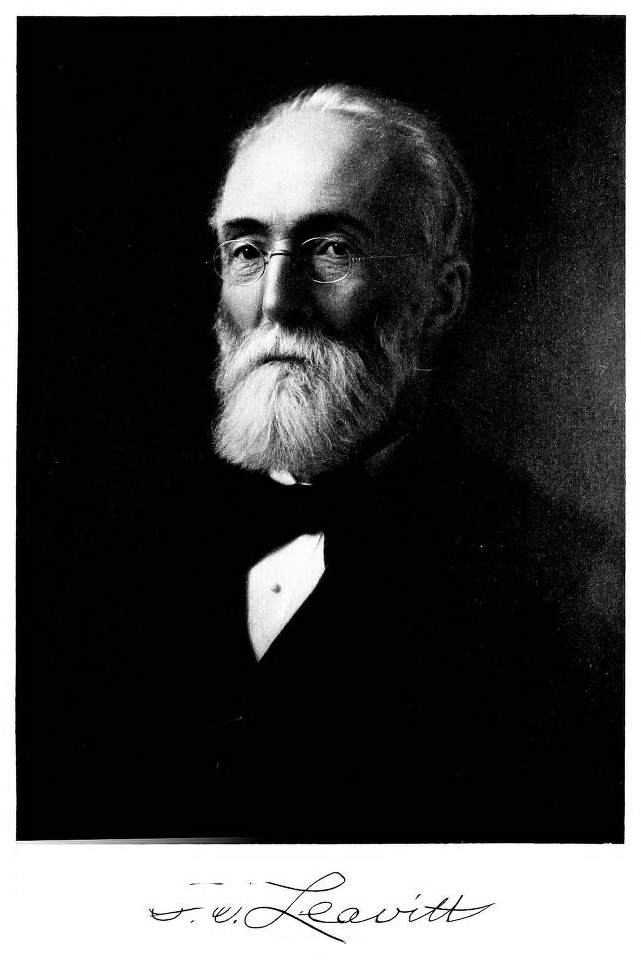
- Portrait, c. 1915
- Born: October 27, 1836; Lowell, Massachusetts, U.S.
- Died: March 11, 1916 (aged 79); Cambridge, Massachusetts, U.S.
- Occupation: Mechanical engineer
- Spouse: Elizabeth Pettit (m. 1867)
- Children: 5

Erasmus Darwin Leavitt Jr. (October 27, 1836 – March 11, 1916), also known as E. D. Leavitt, was an American mechanical engineer best known for his steam engine designs.

== Life and work ==
Leavitt was born in Lowell, Massachusetts to Erasmus Darwin Leavitt Sr., a native of Cornish, New Hampshire, and Almina (Fay) Leavitt. He graduated from local schools at age 16, and performed a 3-year apprenticeship at the Lowell Manufacturing Company.

After his apprenticeship Leavitt worked for one year at the engineering firm of Corliss & Nightingale in Providence, Rhode Island before returning to Boston, where he became assistant foreman for Harrison Loring. In this role he designed the steam engine for the USS Hartford. From 1859–61 he again worked in Providence, this time as chief draftsman for Thurston, Gardner & Company, builders of steam engines.

During the Civil War, Leavitt first served aboard the USS Sagamore, then in construction roles in Baltimore, Boston, and Brooklyn, and ultimately as an instructor in steam engineering at the United States Naval Academy. In 1867 he resigned his teaching post to become a consulting engineer.

Leavitt was a member of the American Academy of Arts and Sciences, and a founding member of the American Society of Mechanical Engineers, for which he served as vice president from 1881 to 1882, and president in 1883. In 1884 he received the first honorary doctorate of engineering degree granted by the Stevens Institute of Technology. He was elected an honorary member of the American Society of Mechanical Engineers in 1915.

Leavitt was a resident of Cambridge, Massachusetts. He and his wife, the former Elizabeth Pettit, daughter of Philadelphia locomotive designer William Pettit, had five children: Mary Alford; Hart Hooker; Margaret Almira; Harriet Sherman; and Annie Louise. The astronomer Henrietta Swan Leavitt was his niece.

== Work ==
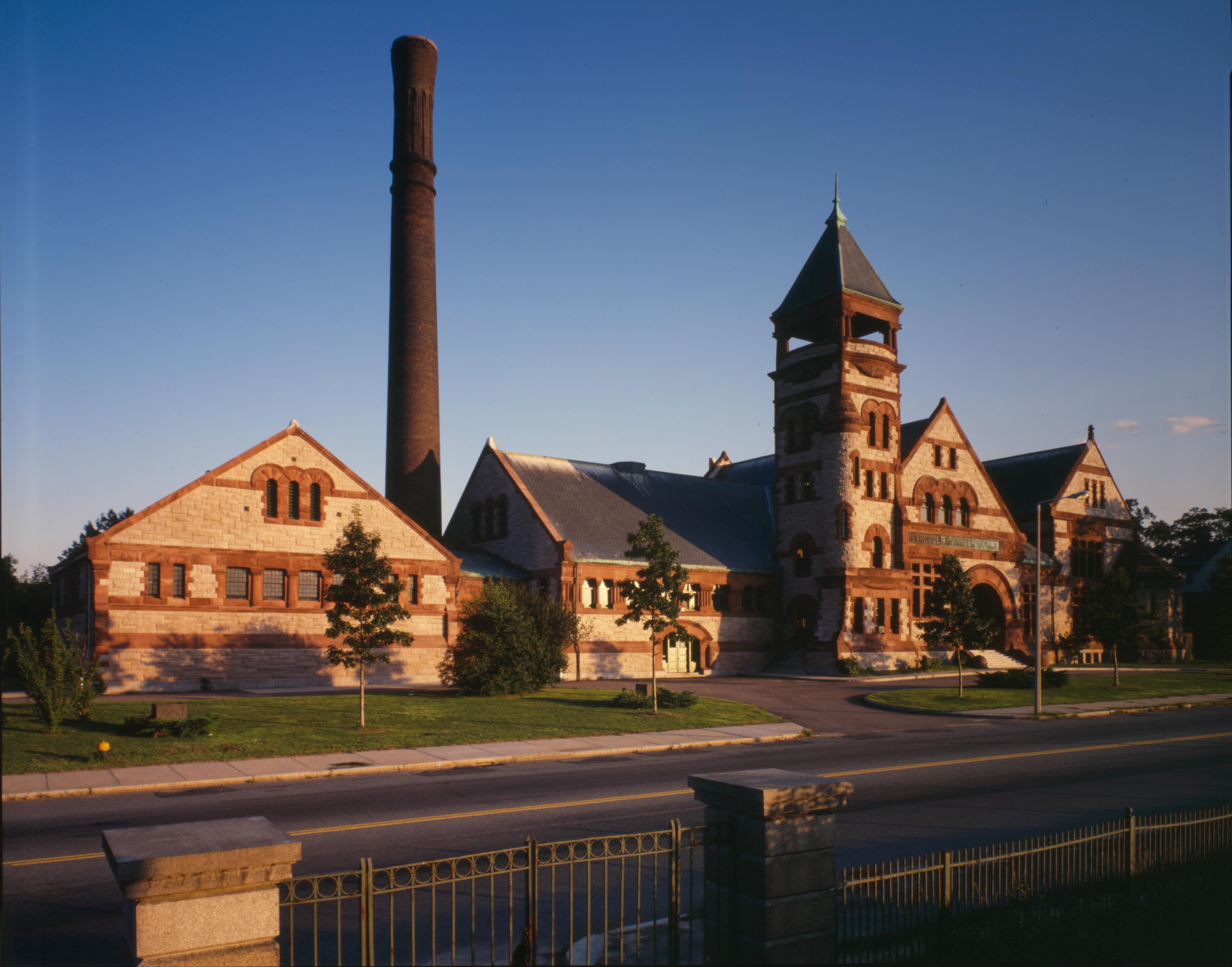
Chestnut Hill, Mass., Pumping Station.

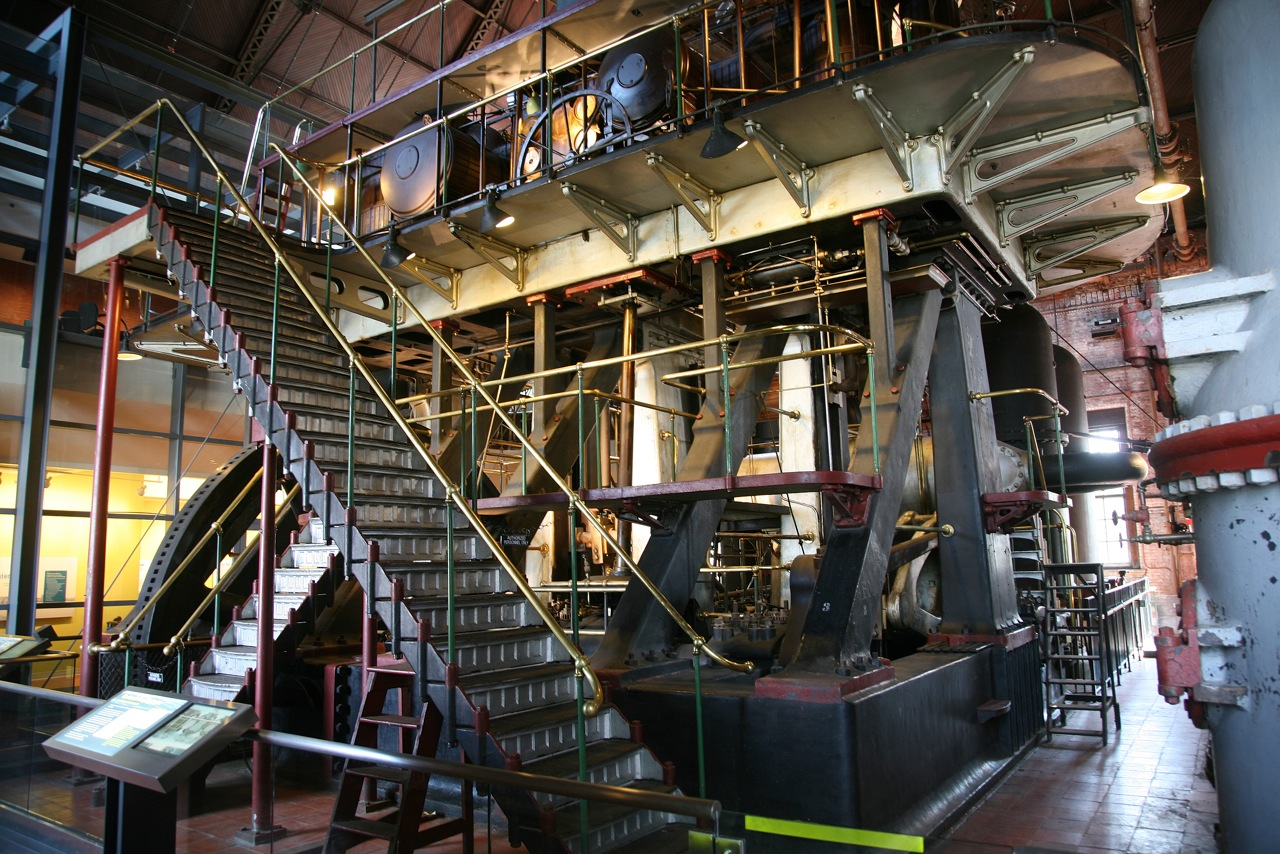
Leavitt-Riedler Pumping Engine designed by Leavitt at Chestnut Hill high-service pumping station

Leavitt first achieved professional prominence in 1873 for his design of a novel pumping engine. From 1874–1904 he served as consulting engineer for the Calumet and Hecla Mining Company, where he designed more than 40 types of engines for a variety of uses for the company's Michigan mines. Each huge stationary steam engine was named, much like a steam locomotive or ship, with names including the Arcadia, Chippewa, Frontenac, Mackinac, Marquette, and Superior.

For the company's smelting plant on the Upper Peninsula of Michigan, Leavitt also designed devices known as sand wheels, which lifted copper tailings and sent them sliding down a sluiceway into nearby Torch Lake. The largest of these wheels was 60-feet in diameter, had 550 buckets, weighed an estimated million pounds, and, when in operation, moved 550,000 pounds of crushed rock every minute. This wheel was made in 1901 by Robert Poole & Son Co. of Baltimore.

He also designed steam-powered water pumps for various municipal water systems, including those of Louisville, Kentucky and Boston, and the power source for a hydraulic forge at the Bethlehem Steel Company.

== Patents ==
- US 129240 A, Improvement in steam pumping-engines, 1872
- US 283261 A, Signor to dauphin, 1883
- US 380330 A, Pump, 1887-88
- US 402256 A, Steam-cylinder for steam-engines, 1888-89
- US 402257 A, Hoisting-engine, 1888-89
