= Alois Riedler =

Austrian mechanical engineer (1850–1936)

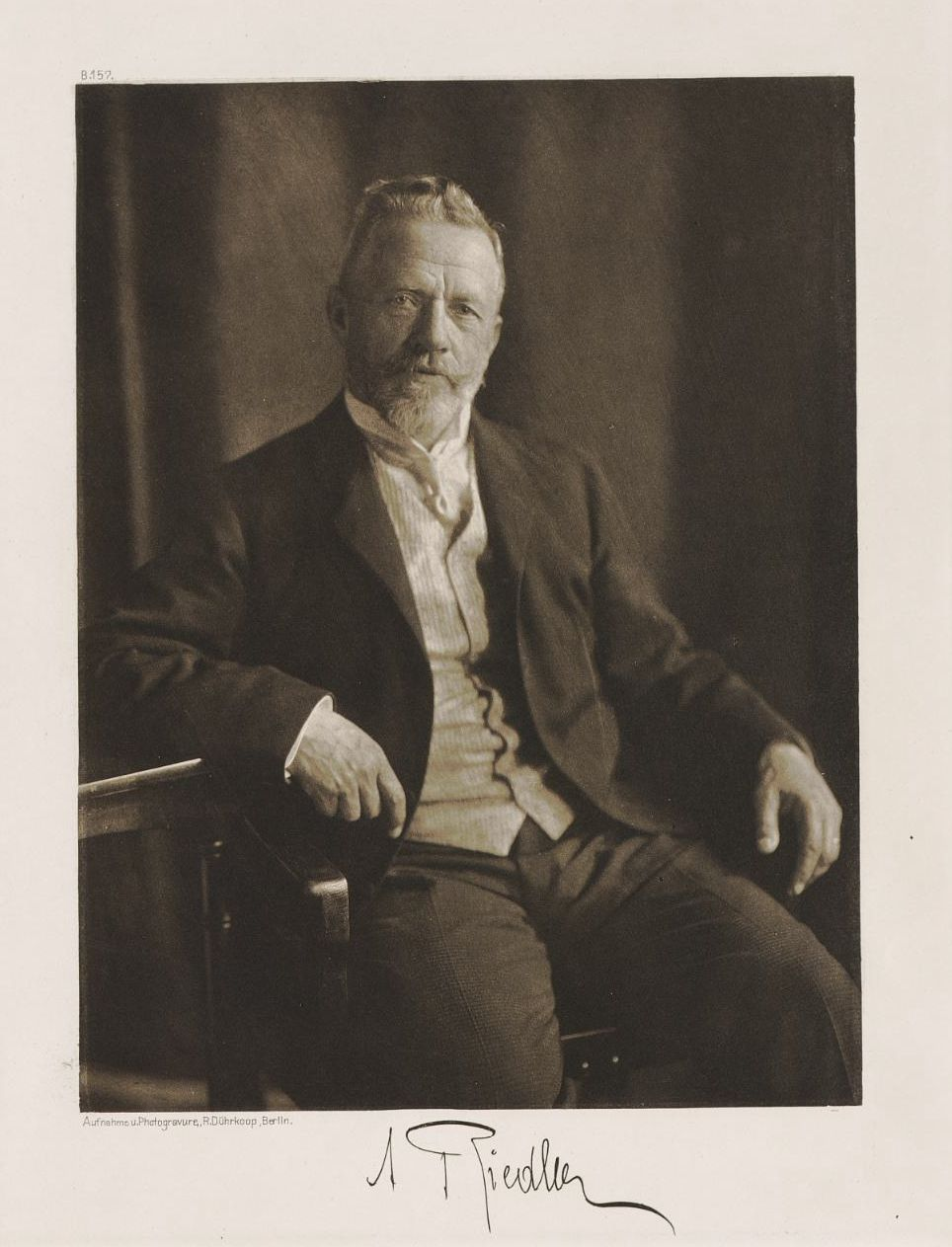
- Alois Riedler
- Born: 15 May 1850; Graz, Austrian Empire
- Died: 25 October 1936 (aged 86); Semmering, Austria
- Other name: Aloys Riedler
- Education: Graz University of Technology
- Known for: modern technical drawing
- Spouse: Fritza (Friederike) Langer
- Children: none
- Scientific career
- Fields: Mechanical Engineering
- Workplaces: Deutsche Technische Hochschule Brünn; Vienna University of Technology; Technical University of Munich; RWTH Aachen University; Technische Universität Berlin

Alois Riedler (May 15, 1850 - October 25, 1936) was a noted Austrian mechanical engineer, and, as professor in Germany, a vigorous proponent of practically oriented engineering education.

== Career ==
Riedler was born in Graz, Austria, and studied mechanical engineering at the Technische Hochschule (TH) Graz from 1866 to 1871. After graduation he took on a succession of academic appointments. He first became an assistant at the TH Brünn (1871-1873); then in 1873 moved to the TH Vienna, first as an assistant, then from 1875 onwards as a designer of machines. From 1880 to 1883, Riedler worked as associate professor at the TH Munich. In 1883 he became full professor at the TH Aachen.

In 1888 he joined the Technische Hochschule Berlin as Professor for Mechanical Engineering, where he remained until retirement in 1921. From 1899 to 1900, he was appointed the school's principal (rector) and led discussions on how to celebrate its 100th anniversary. As a result, Riedler and Adolf Slaby (1849–1913) convinced Kaiser Wilhelm II (1859–1941) to allow Prussian Technische Hochschulen to award doctorates. Although the government did not immediately consent, this effort led eventually to the school's reconstitution as today's Technische Universität Berlin.

Riedler first received international recognition for his reports on the Philadelphia Centennial Exposition (1876) and Paris Exposition Universelle (1878). He was later widely known for his efficient, high-speed pumps widely adopted in waterworks and in draining mines.

In 1893 Riedler and some employees traveled to World's Columbian Exposition in Chicago. He delivered a detailed report on American institutes of technology and their labs which he deemed more suitable for engineering education. Riedler was heavily involved in the following reform process with regard to technical education. In 1896, Riedler established the first German mechanical engineering lab which was located in Charlottenburg. In the following years technical labs were established at all the other German TH as well and the study program became more practice oriented.

Alois Riedler was also known for his 1896 book "Das Maschinen-Zeichnen", (Machine Drawing) which introduced modern technical drawing.

Riedler was actively involved in the early development of internal combustion engines, both for gasoline and diesel fuel. In 1903 he established the Laboratory for Internal Combustion Engines at the TH Berlin, expanded in 1907 to include investigations of motor vehicles. As laboratory director, Riedler designed a pioneering roller test stand. He also received what was probably the first research contract to investigate fuels specifically for aircraft engines (particularly benzene).

Alois Riedler also tried to establish an academy of technical sciences. Despite the emperor's support those efforts failed.

== Private life ==
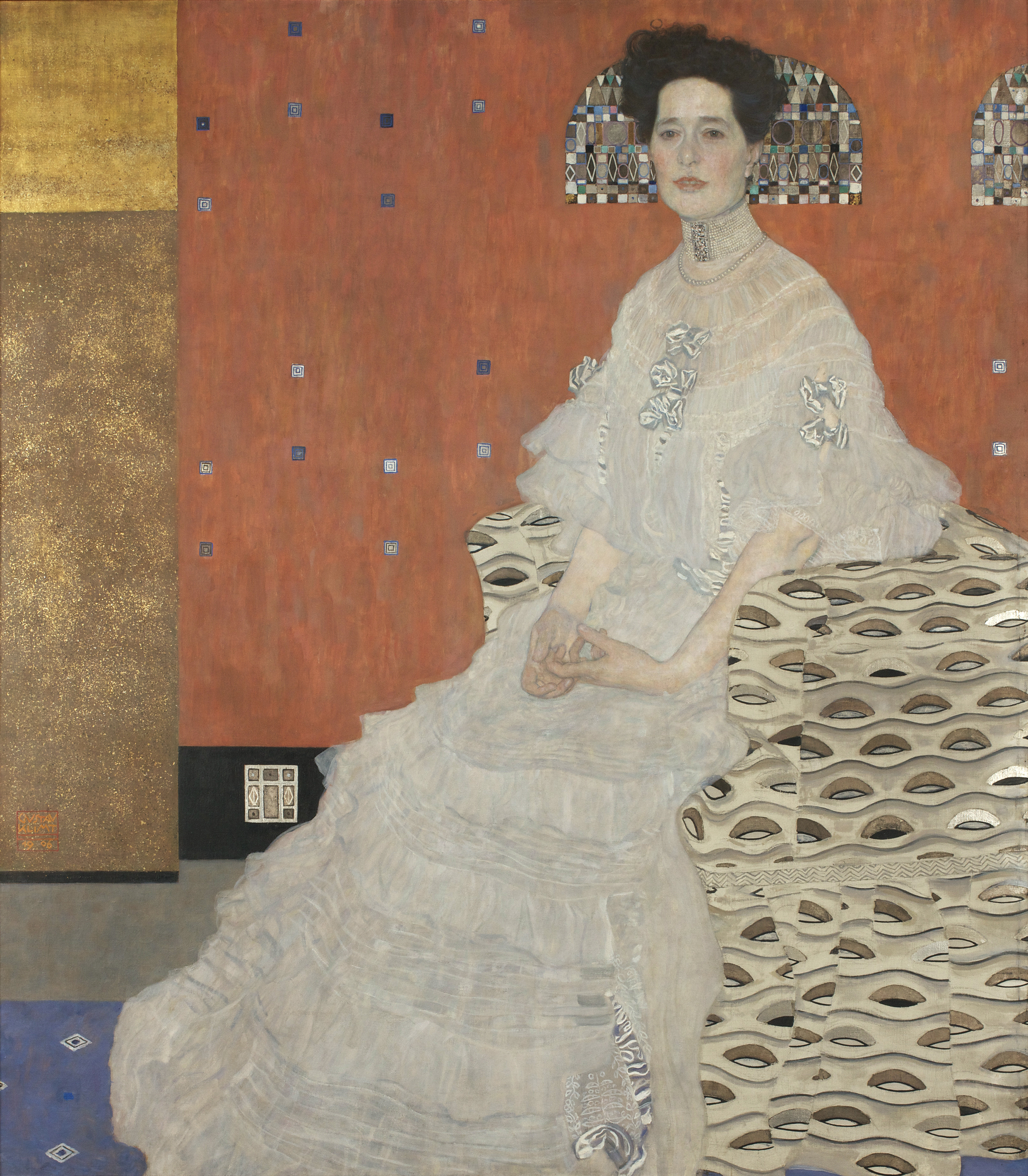
Fritza Riedler

Alois Riedler was married to Fritza, née Friederike Langer. Fritza was born on September 9, 1860 in Berlin. Together with her siblings Paul, Emilie and Alfons she owned a house in Vienna. Alois and Fritza therefore had residences in Berlin and Vienna. Riedler declined an appointment to the TH in Vienna in 1903, where he was supposed to succeed Leopold von Hauffe. Riedler claimed that the German Emperor himself fervently asked him to stay in Berlin. In 1921 the Riedlers moved to Vienna for good.

Fritza is well known for Gustav Klimt’s painting of her. In 1906 Klimt depictured her in oil on canvas based on a series of more than 20 sketches. Fritza, who died in 1927, and Alois had no descendants. In 1937, Emilie Langer sold Klimt’s portrait to the Belvedere collection.

== Honours ==
In 1897 Riedler received the Grashof medal, the German Engineers' Association's highest honor. The Austrian Engineers' and Architects' Association appointed him honorary member in 1900 and awarded him their gold medal in 1931. In 1904 he was awarded the Order of Franz Joseph in the rank of a Commander with Star. In 1911 his alma mater TH Graz awarded him an honorary doctorate.

== See also ==
- Leavitt-Riedler Pumping Engine
