= Friedrichshafen =

- Town
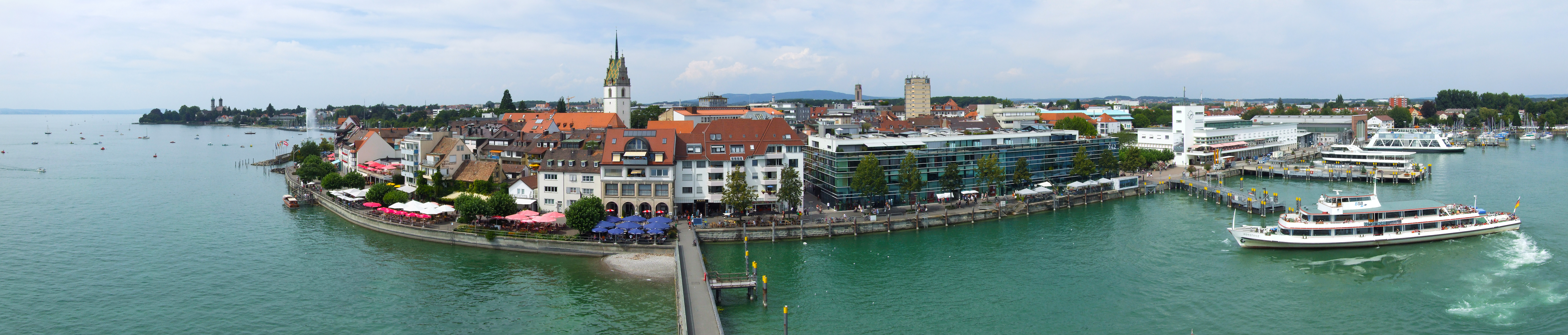
- Friedrichshafen in August 2009

- Coat of arms

- Location of Friedrichshafen within Bodenseekreis district
- Interactive map of Friedrichshafen
- Location within Germany Location within Baden-Württemberg
- Coordinates: 47°39′N 9°29′E
- Country: Germany
- State: Baden-Württemberg
- Admin. region: Tübingen
- District: Bodenseekreis

Government
  - Mayor (2017–25): Andreas Brand (Ind.)

Area
  - Total: 69.91 km^{2} (26.99 sq mi)
- Elevation: 400 m (1,300 ft)

Population (2025-12-31)
  - Total: 62,781
  - Density: 898.0/km^{2} (2,326/sq mi)
- Time zone: UTC+01:00 (CET)
  - Summer (DST): UTC+02:00 (CEST)
- Postal codes: 88045–88048
- Dialling codes: 07541, 07544
- Vehicle registration: FN
- Website: www.friedrichshafen.de

Friedrichshafen (German pronunciation: [ˈfʁiːdʁɪçsˌhaːfn̩] or [fʁiːdʁɪçsˈhaːfn̩]; Low Alemannic: Hafe or Fridrichshafe) is a city on the northern shoreline of Lake Constance (the Bodensee) in Southern Germany, near the borders of both Switzerland and Austria. It is the district capital (Kreisstadt) of the Bodensee district in the federal state of Baden-Württemberg. Friedrichshafen has a population of about 63,000.

== History ==
=== 19th and early 20th century ===
Friedrichshafen was established in 1811 as part of the new Kingdom of Württemberg, an ally of France during the Napoleonic Wars. It was named for King Frederick I of Württemberg, who privileged it as a free port and transshipment point for the kingdom's Swiss trade. Friedrichshafen was created from the former city of Buchhorn, whose coat of arms it adopted. The new city also incorporated the former village of Hofen, whose monastery was refurbished to serve as the summer residence of the Württemberger kings.

King William I continued improving the city, including the purchase of the steamship Wilhelm. Ministers and senior officials built villas around the royal castle, and many foreign tourists visited the city as well, including Tsar Alexander II of Russia. The first track laid by the Royal Württemberg State Railways connected the port to Ravensburg in 1847. Heilbronn was connected in 1850, and a ferry to Romanshorn in Switzerland began operating in 1869. Despite their previous opposition to Prussia, under the federal structure of the German Empire, Württemberg and Friedrichshafen continued to enjoy some special privileges following their incorporation into Germany following the Franco-Prussian War.

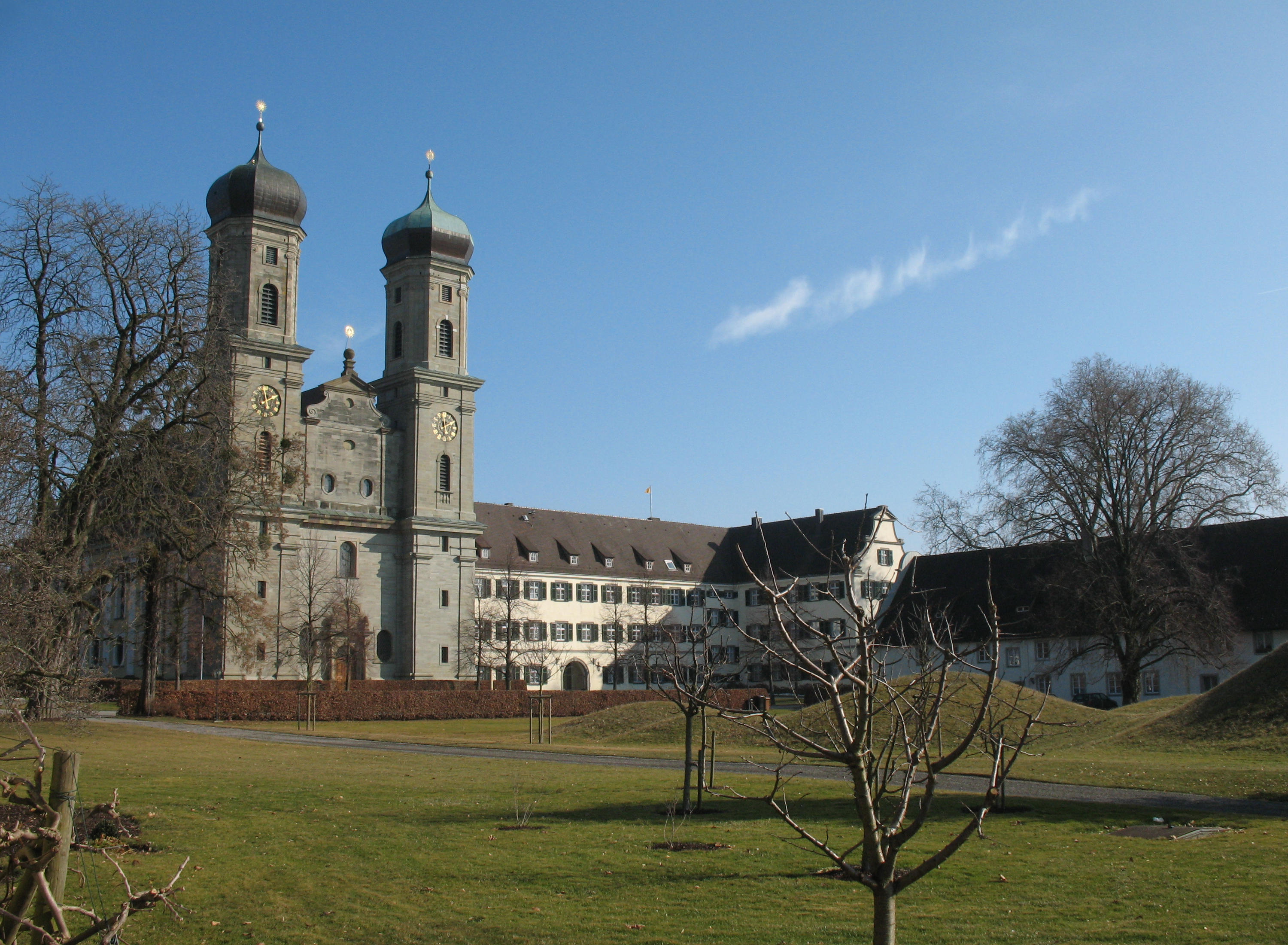
Castle

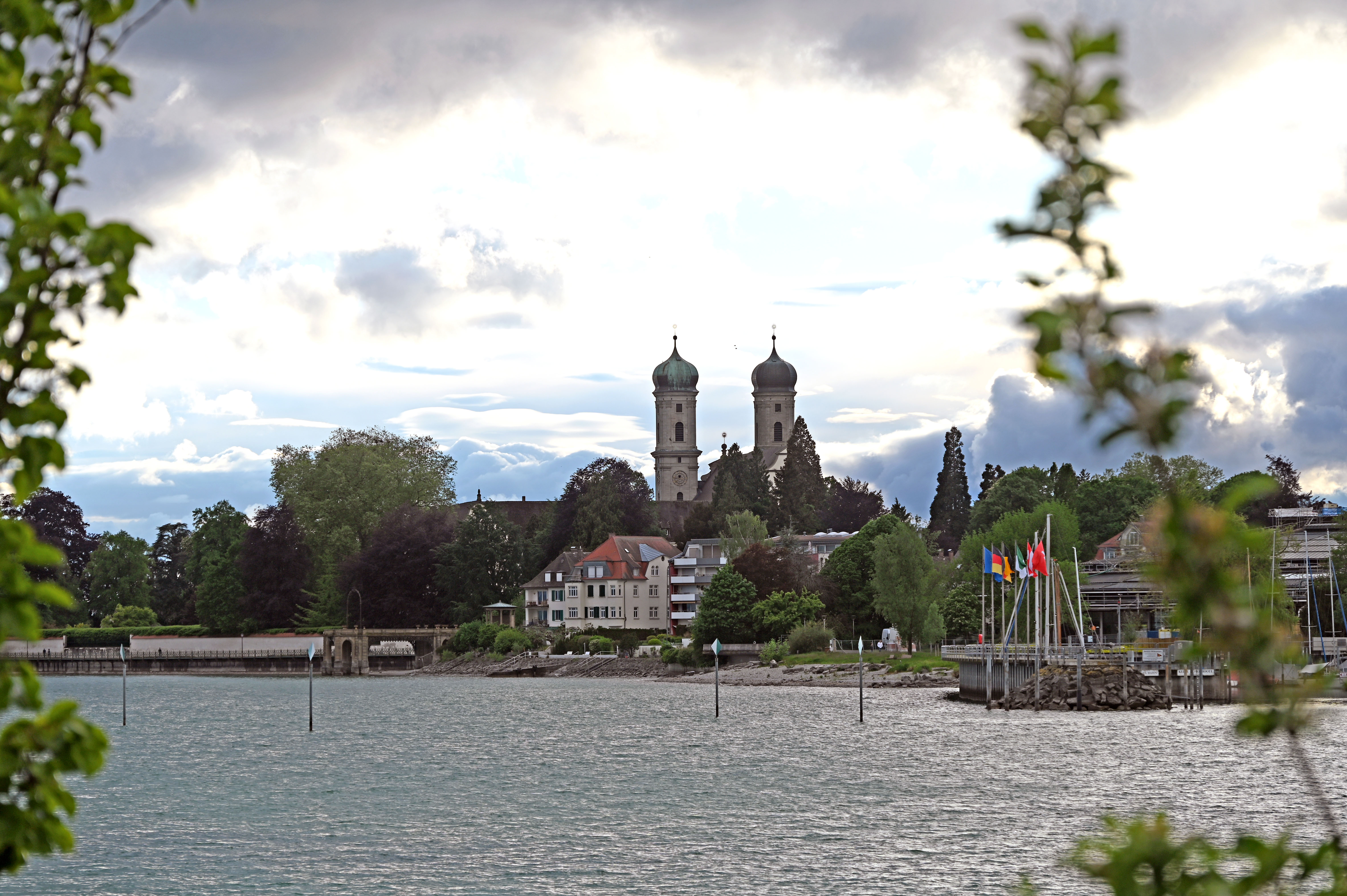
View from Lake Constance of All Saints' Church and Graf Zeppelin House

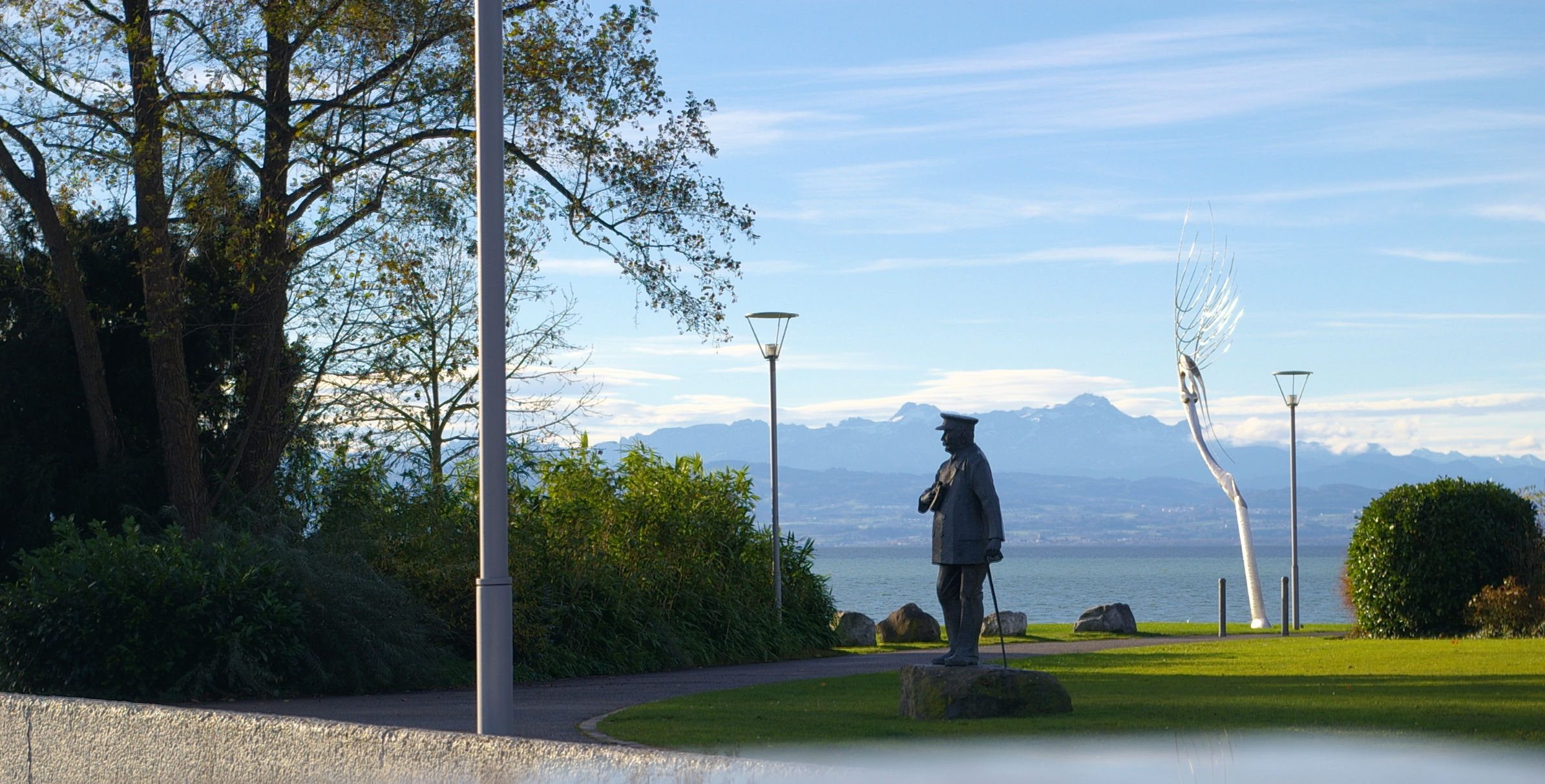
Zeppelin-Statue at Graf Zeppelin House, Säntis in the background

Ferdinand von Zeppelin established his famous dirigible factory at the end of the 19th century. The 128m-long LZ1 airship rose from its mooring on 2 July 1900. Other aviation companies, including Maybach, also arose in Friedrichshafen to help service the industry, which received a major impetus from World War I. Following the Treaty of Versailles, the Kingdom of Württemberg was dissolved but the deposed royal family continued in their possession of their castle in Friedrichshafen, despite a workers' revolution there in November 1918.

=== World War II ===
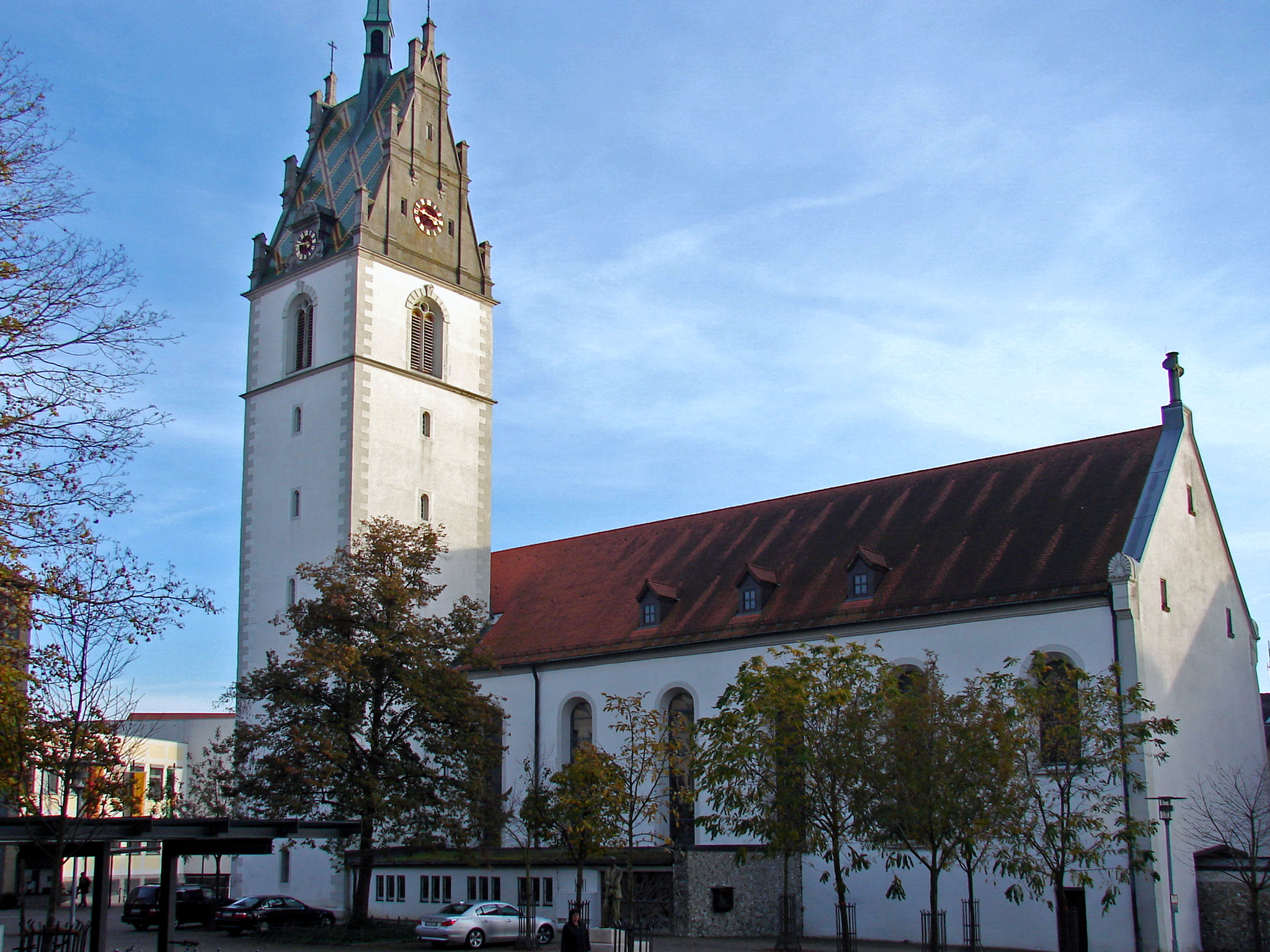
Church of St. Nikolaus

Friedrichshafen served the Nazi regime as a resort for workers. The presence of Zeppelin, Maybach, Dornier, and Zahnradfabrik made it an important German industrial center during World War II. Between 1942 and 1945, the factories used slave labor of hundreds of concentration camp prisoners from Dachau and Dora-Mittelbau. They were housed first at Zeppelin's hangar and then, following its destruction during a raid, the V-2 factory Raderach. The prisoners were also used to dig tunnels near Friedrichshafen to protect production sites from the repeated bombing.

Between June 1943 and February 1945, the city was targeted for Allied bombing attacks. The most accurate took place on 28 April 1944, and destroyed most of the old town center. Approximately two-thirds of the city was destroyed over the course of the war.

=== Modern Germany ===
Following World War II, Friedrichshafen was part of the French occupation zone before its incorporation into Baden-Württemberg, West Germany. In the aftermath of the war, Maybach and many other aviation companies turned to automobile construction, while Claudius Dornier purchased Theodor Kober's failed Flugzeugbau Friedrichshafen and established Dornier Flugzeugwerke. Owing to the provisions of the Versailles treaty, many of the planes were initially produced in Italy, Spain, the Netherlands or Japan, but resumed work at its Friedrichshafen and other German factories following the rise of the Nazi regime. The 1937 Hindenburg disaster and a subsequent embargo on sending American helium to Germany, however, effectively ended the production of German dirigibles. The German aeronautics industry was again banned for many years after the war, and companies again failed or shifted production.

The city's principal recovery dates to its establishment as the administrative seat of the Bodenseekreis district of West Germany, in 1973. The last French troops withdrew from their "Durand de Villers" Quarter (Quartier Durand de Villers) in 1992.

== Geography ==
=== Geographical location ===
Friedrichshafen is located on a gently curved bay on the north shore of Lake Constance and on the southwest edge of the Schussen. The city is over an altitude of 395.2 m above sea level. NHH on the shores of Lake Constance up to 501.6 m in Ailingen. The core city is located not far to the west of the confluence of the Rotach and Lake Constance. Coming from Oberteuringen, this river reaches the city west of the village of Ailingen and flows through some smaller districts before it flows into the lake on the eastern edge of the city center. The somewhat larger Schussen touches the northeast corner of the urban area.

=== Neighboring communities ===
The following municipalities border the city of Friedrichshafen:

Immenstaad, Markdorf, Oberteuringen, Ravensburg, Meckenbeuren, Tettnang and Eriskich.

=== Climate ===
Friedrichshafen's climate is mainly influenced by the Lake Constance and the nearby Alps. Compared to the Hinterland, the temperatures are rather mild. The proximity to the Alps creates foehn winds and sometimes strong thunderstorms. In addition, fog often forms in winter.

Climate data for Friedrichshafen
Month	Jan	Feb	Mar	Apr	May	Jun	Jul	Aug	Sep	Oct	Nov	Dec	Year
Mean daily maximum °F	36.1	39.6	47.8	55.6	64.4	70.3	73.8	72.1	66.7	55.8	45.3	38.1	55.6
Mean daily minimum °F	27.1	28.6	33.4	39.4	46.8	53.2	56.7	55.8	50.5	43.0	35.4	29.5	41.7
Average precipitation inches	2.4	2.4	2.1	2.9	3.8	4.8	5.2	4.7	3.2	2.6	2.9	2.3	39.3
Mean daily maximum °C	2.3	4.2	8.8	13.1	18.0	21.3	23.2	22.3	19.3	13.2	7.4	3.4	13.1
Mean daily minimum °C	−2.7	−1.9	0.8	4.1	8.2	11.8	13.7	13.2	10.3	6.1	1.9	−1.4	5.4
Average precipitation mm	60	61	54	73	96	121	133	120	81	65	73	58	995

=== Border with Baden ===
The border line between the former states of Baden and Württemberg ran on the Grenzbach between Friedrichshafen, Fischbach and Immenstaad. Remains of the "Grenzhof" can still be found between the Bundesstraße 31 and the nature-protected shore zone.

== Economy ==
=== Aviation ===
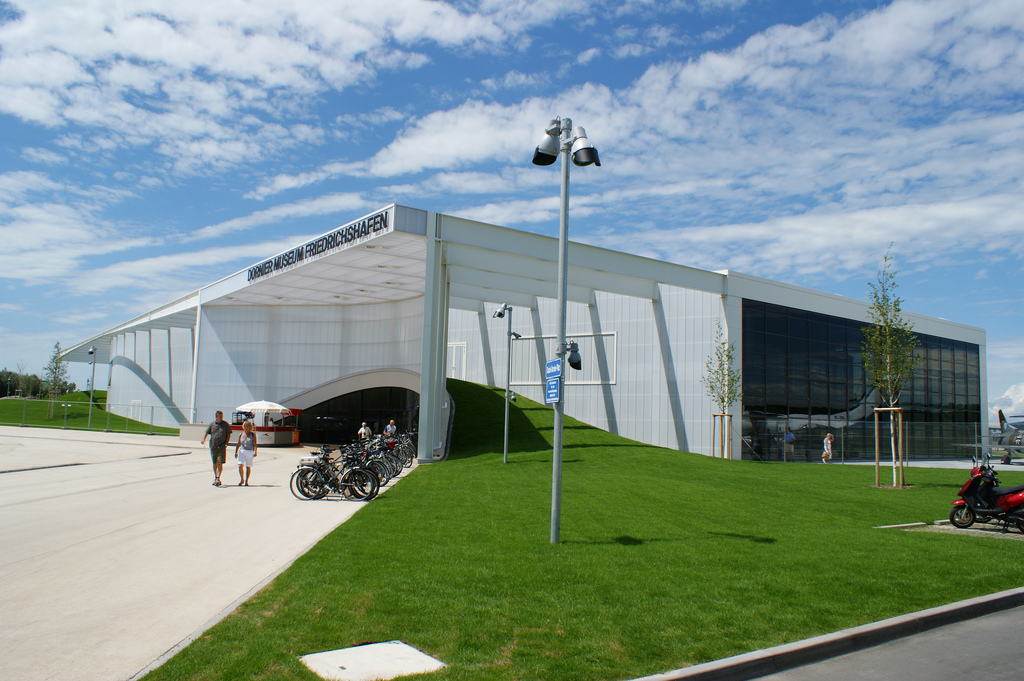
Dornier-Museum

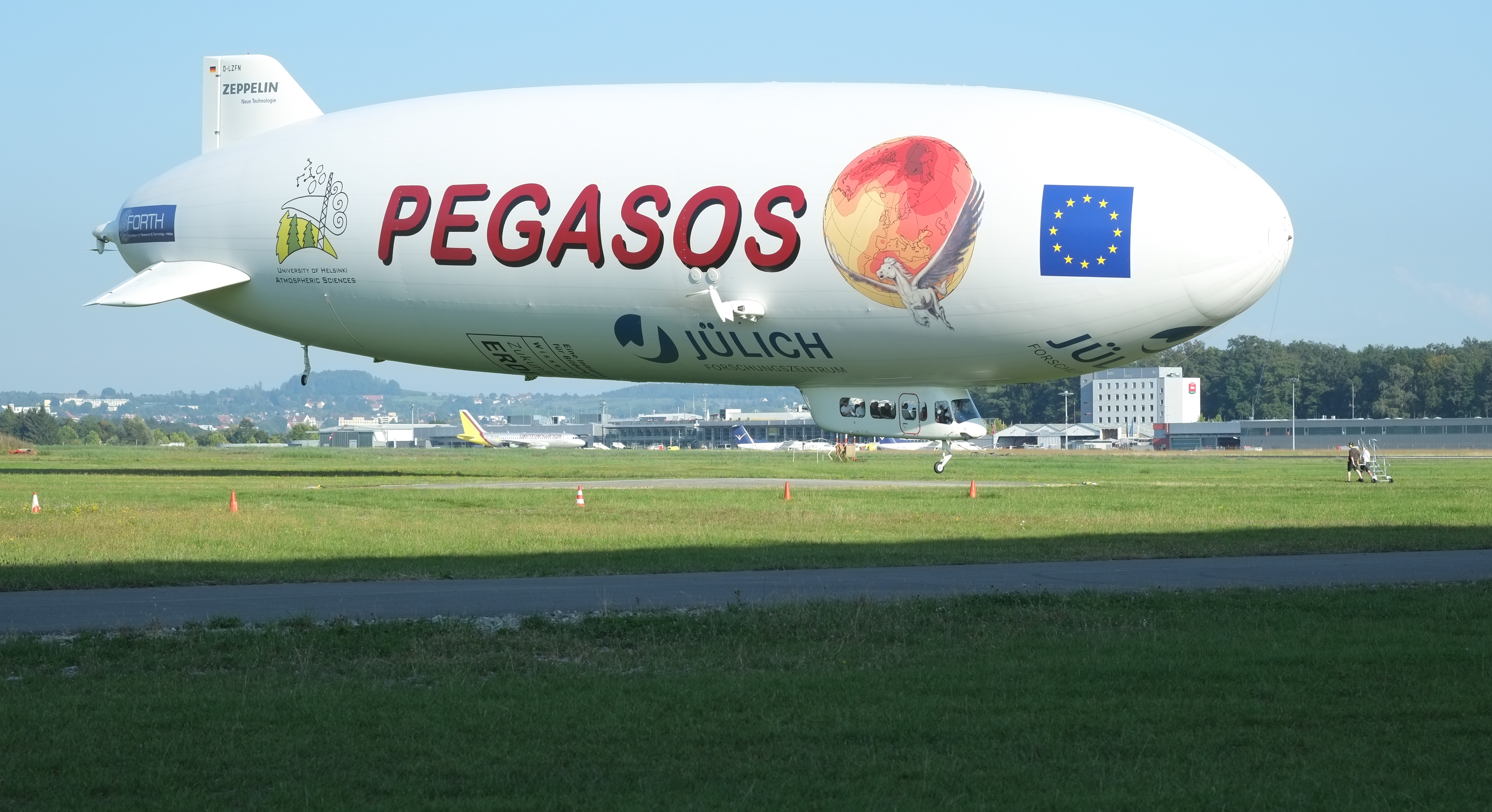
Zeppelin NT Airship

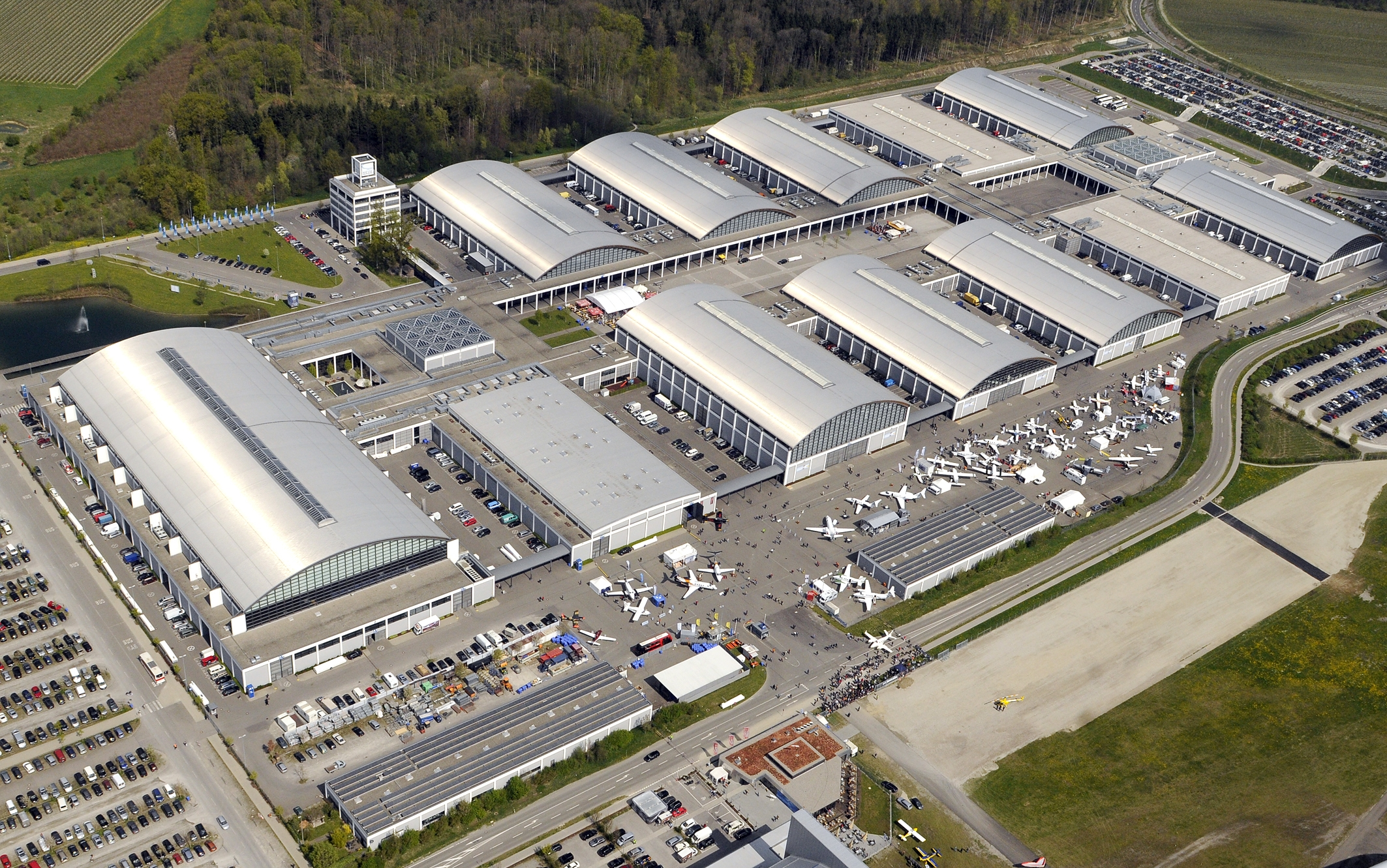
Friedrichshafen's fair ground during AERO in 2011

Airship construction in the first third of the 20th century attracted considerable industry and contributed significantly to Friedrichshafen's relative prosperity. Friedrichshafen is best known for having been home to the Luftschiffbau Zeppelin Airship Company, the aircraft manufacturer Dornier Flugzeugwerke, ZF Friedrichshafen, a manufacturer of transmission systems and MTU Friedrichshafen GmbH, the engine manufacturing company founded by Wilhelm Maybach.

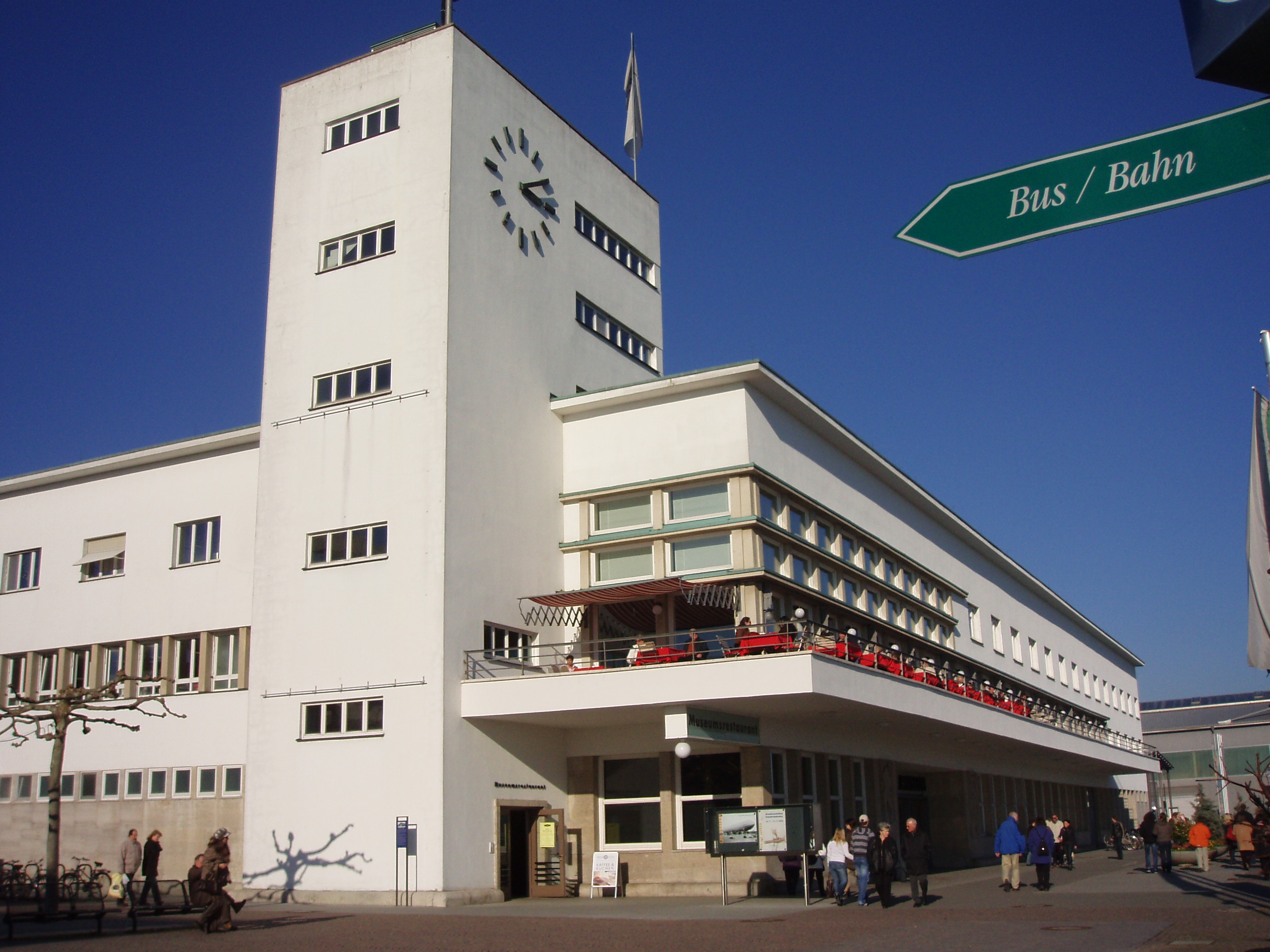
Zeppelin Museum

Ferdinand von Zeppelin, who was born in Konstanz (Constance), originally had his airships built in a floating airship hangar on the lake which could be aligned with the wind to support the difficult launch procedure of rigid airship flight. Today there is a large Zeppelin Museum in Friedrichshafen sited near the lake shore. In recent years the company ZLT Zeppelin Luftschifftechnik GmbH, also located in Friedrichshafen, is the constructor of small, semi-rigid airships designed by the Zeppelin firm, named (called Zeppelin NT), by using modern technology. These airships can be booked for sightseeing tours above Lake Constance.

Airbus Defence and Space maintains a site outside Friedrichshafen in Immenstaad am Bodensee, which is considered today as the successor of the Dornier Flugzeugwerke company. The Dornier Museum is located at the Friedrichshafen Airport and displays restored Dornier aviation technology as well as modern space technology.

AERO Friedrichshafen is a yearly aviation conference that hosted an attendance of 33,400 in 2011, and 30,800 in 2012. Aero 2013 took place on 24–27 April 2013 at Friedrichshafen Airport.

=== Other ===
Rolls-Royce Power Systems AG (MTU), the German engine manufacturing company owned by Rolls-Royce is also located in Friedrichshafen.

Apart from industry and tourism, various international regular trade fairs, such as Aero (aviation technology), Interboot (water sports), OutDoor, Motorradwelt (Motorbikes), Eurobike (bicycles) and Tuning World Bodensee (car tuning) are important economical factors. There is a large fair ground (Messe Friedrichshafen) near Friedrichshafen airport where all these and many more trade fairs take place every year. Furthermore, the Graf-Zeppelin-Haus cultural centre has become a popular location for congresses, conferences, musical and other events.

Friedrichshafen is the location for Europe's largest ham radio convention.

== Education ==
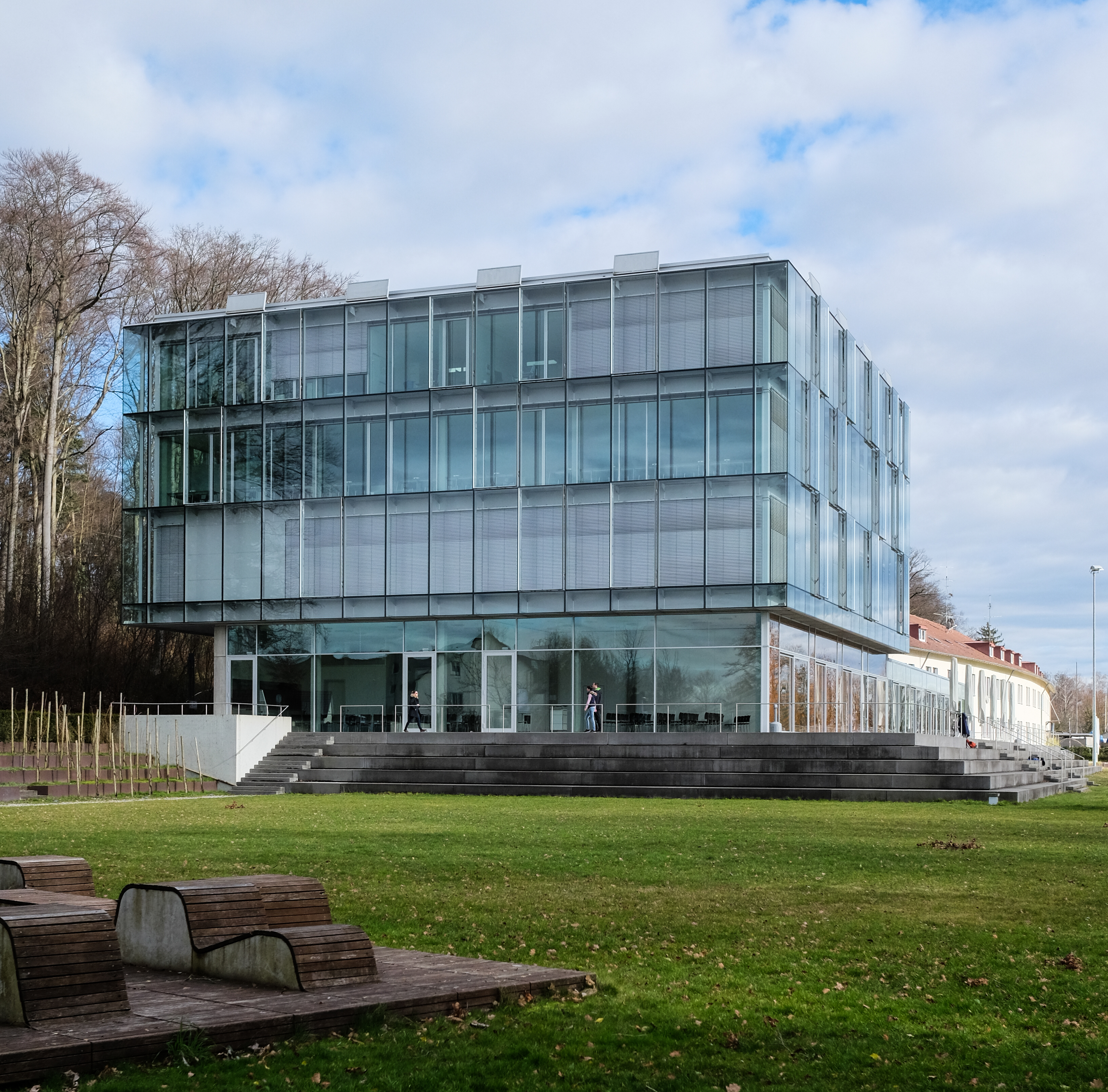
Zeppelin University (LakeCampus)

Zeppelin University, a private research university, is the only private university in the state of Baden-Württemberg to have received the rare right to confer PhD titles to its students. Only founded in 2003, its Cultural & Communication Management programme has been already ranked the best university programme in that field in German speaking countries, according to the prestigious CHE ranking. The programme in Public Management & Governance was ranked 4th while the programme in Corporate Management & Economics was ranked 6th among all examined German, Austrian, Swiss and Dutch universities (figures from 2011). Zeppelin University holds the title of the 'most committed' university in Germany with regard to civil society issues (Stifterverband für die deutsche Wissenschaft/Stiftung Mercator 2011). Ravensburg University of Cooperative Education also has a campus in Friedrichshafen.

== Sports ==
VfB Friedrichshafen is a professional volleyball team based on Friedrichshafen. It is one of the top teams in Bundesliga.

== Culture ==
=== Music ===
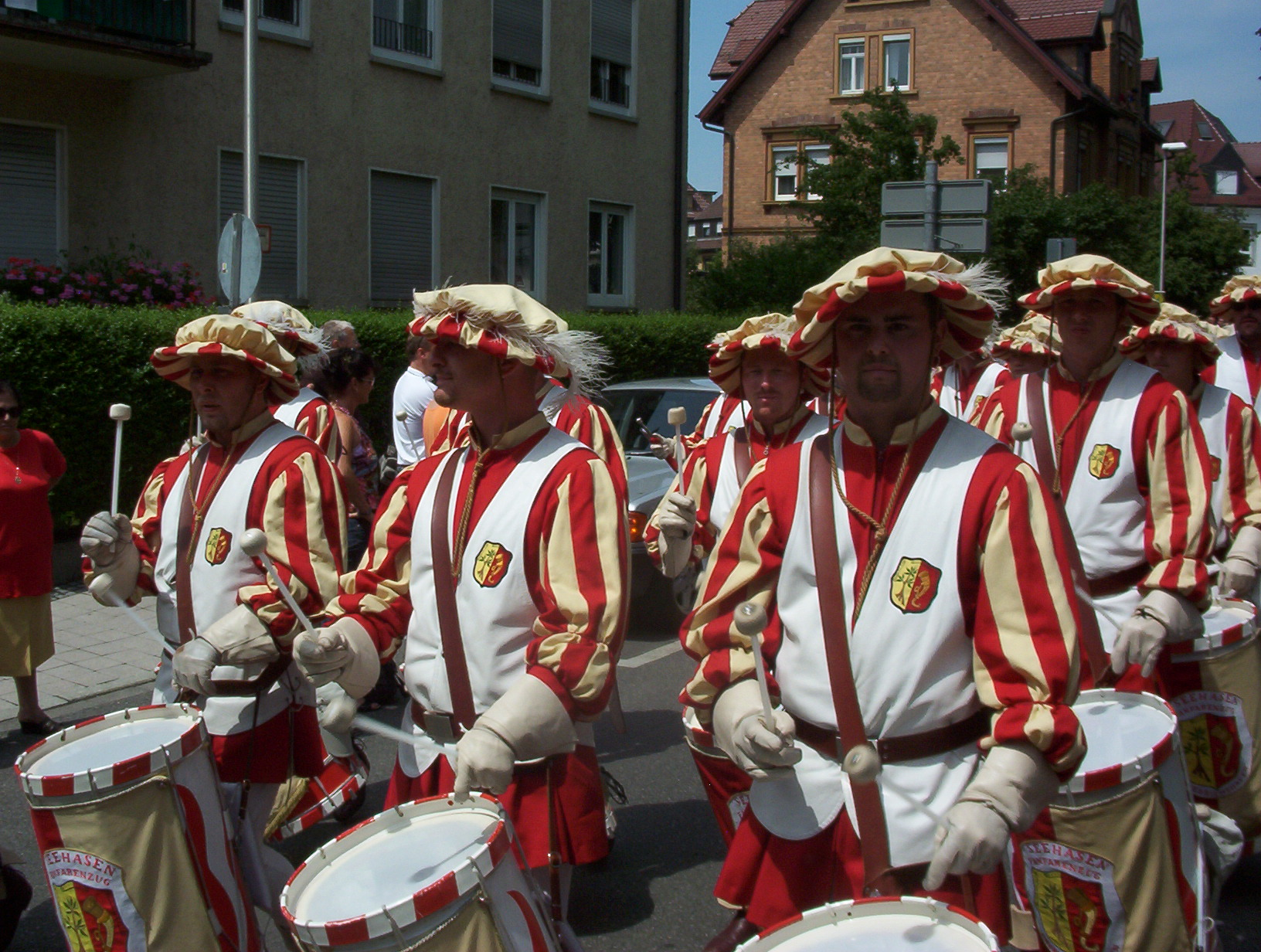
A fanfare band

The Seehasen-Fanfarenzug was founded in 1956 on the occasion of the Seehasenfest and Erich Deisel, a teacher at the Graf Zeppelin Gymnasium. At that time the club consisted of four drummers and two fanfare players. In 1959 the first typical yellow and red costumes reminiscent of the character from the Spanish era were designed. In 1972 the fanfare band took part in the German Championship of Fanfare Bands and came eighth place. Up until the 50th anniversary in 2006, he organized many concerts abroad and won several prizes in competitions across Germany.

The Friedrichshafen Music School was founded in 1953 as a municipal educational institution. In 2003 it moved to the newly built building near the Graf Zeppelin Gymnasium.

=== Festivals ===
Friedrichshafen has a number of town and local festivals that are held annually. Since 1985, the Kulturufer has taken place at the beginning of the summer holidays, a ten-day tent festival on the shores of Lake Constance. The performances range from music events to cabaret, drama and dance to readings, acrobatics and street theater. There is also a daily theater program for children in the tent. The Kulturufer is organized by the Culture Office and the Office for Family, Youth and Social Affairs.

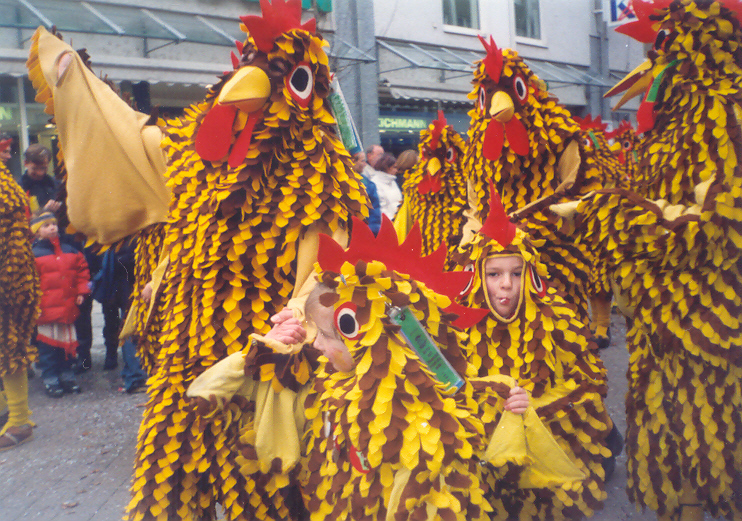
Children and adults wearing Seegockel at the carnival parade

One of the most famous and oldest festivals in Friedrichshafen is the Seehasenfest, a local kids festival that has been taking place since the post-war period.

== Transport ==
The city has a total of nine railway stations:

- Friedrichshafen-Fischbach
- Friedrichshafen Flughafen
- Friedrichshafen Hafen
- Friedrichshafen-Kluftern
- Friedrichshafen Landratsamt
- Löwental
- Friedrichshafen Manzell
- Friedrichshafen Ost
- Friedrichshafen Stadt

Friedrichshafen Stadt is the principal railway station, which enjoys train services at regular intervals to Lindau and Ulm, as well as to Schaffhausen and Basel in Switzerland. This station is located on the Lake Constance Belt Railway, with regional trains to other lakeside towns. Friedrichshafen Hafen station is located next to the ferry terminal.

A car ferry service links Friedrichshafen to Romanshorn in Switzerland, and various other towns around the lake can also be reached by ferry. Since 2005, a fast catamaran ferry connection has been in service between Friedrichshafen and Konstanz.

Friedrichshafen Airport (Flughafen) is the local airport. The Zeppelin manufacturing company Luftschiffbau Zeppelin (LZ) was re-established in 1993, and a commercial airline Deutsche Zeppelin Reederei (DZR) began flying passenger service from Friedrichshafen Airport in 2001. However, in recent years, passenger numbers have decreased such that, as of 2024, Friedrichshafen Airport no longer connects any domestic destinations. The nearest major airport is Zurich Airport, located 97 km (60 mi) south west of the city.

== Notable people ==
=== Arts ===
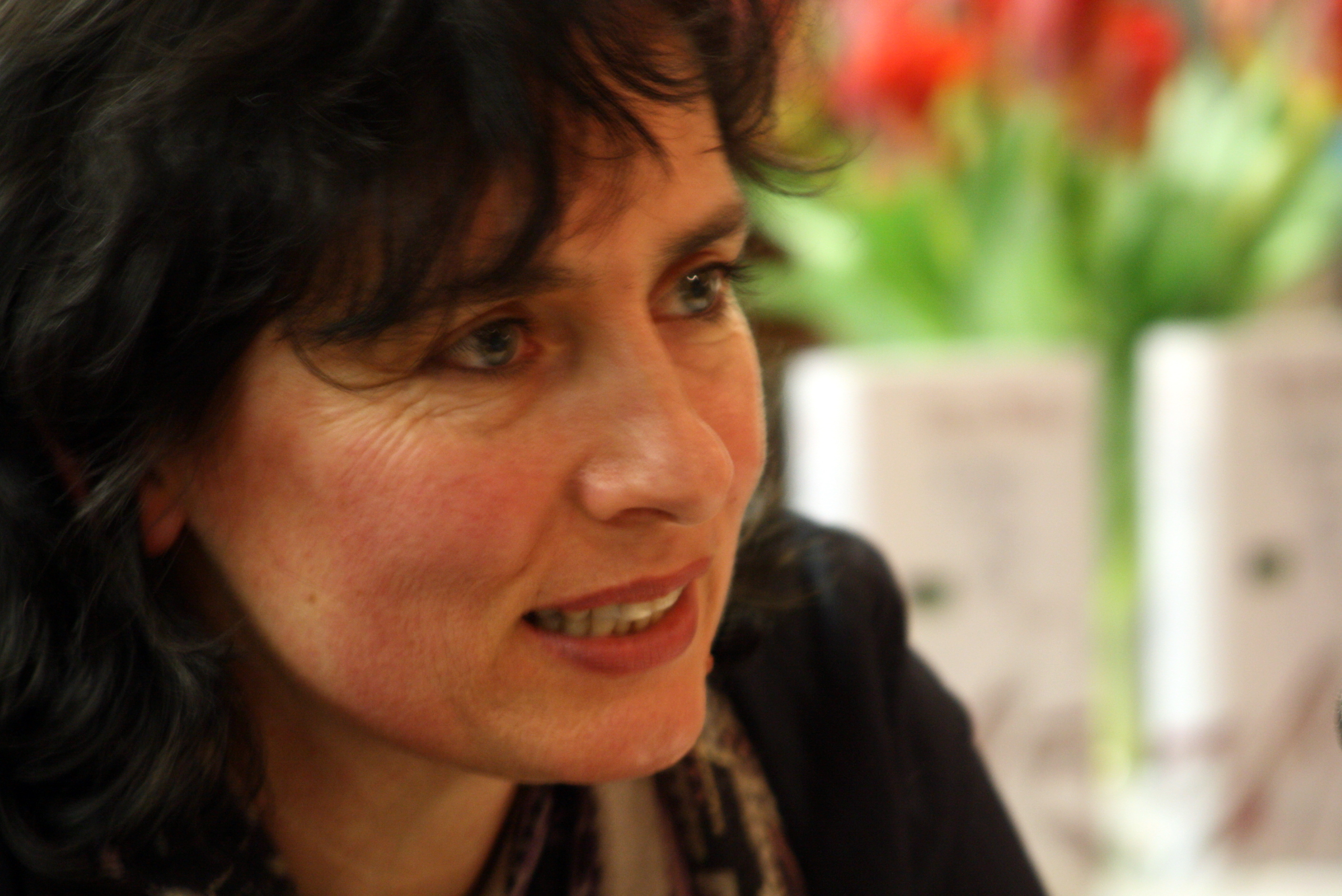
Alissa Walser, 2010

- Matteo Pertsch (1769–1834), Austrian classical architect responsible for many historic structures in Trieste
- Alfonsas Dargis (1909–1996), Lithuanian painter, graphic artist, set designer and poet; died locally
- Albrecht Roser (1922–2011), puppeteer
- Stefan Waggershausen (born 1949), singer, composer, and songwriter
- Peter Rundel (born 1958), violinist and conductor
- Alissa Walser (born 1961), writer and artist; daughter of poet Martin Walser
- Philippe Bühler (born 1981), singer, songwriter, dancer and record producer
- Alicia von Rittberg (born 1993), actress and local student
- Philipp Riederle (born 1994), author, consultant, podcaster and local student

=== Science and technicians ===
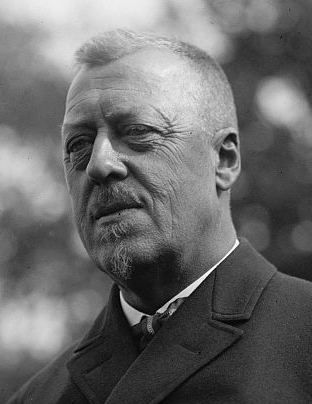
Hugo Eckener, 1924

- Heinrich Lanz (1838–1905), agricultural machinery manufacturers Heinrich Lanz AG, Lanz Bulldog
- Wilhelm Maybach (1846–1929), engine designer and industrialist, worked locally after WW1
- Hugo Eckener (1868–1954), manager of the Luftschiffbau Zeppelin between the wars, worked and died locally
- Hermann Blau (1871–1944), engineer and chemist and inventor of Blau gas, worked locally
- Ludwig Dürr (1878–1956), airship designer, died locally
- Claude Dornier (1884–1969), airplane builder and founder of Dornier GmbH, worked locally from 1910
- Friedrich von Arnauld de la Perière (1888–1969), aviator, died locally.
- Franz-Zeno Diemer (1889–1954), flight pioneer, test pilot for BMW, died locally
- Oberleutnant Hans Bethge (1890–1918), WWI flying ace and aerial commander, grew up locally
- Richard Vogt (1894–1979), engineer and aircraft designer, worked locally from 1916
- Patrick A. Baeuerle (born 1957), molecular biologist
- Stefan Sommer (born 1963), CEO of ZF Friedrichshafen AG from 2012 until 2017.

=== Thinkers ===
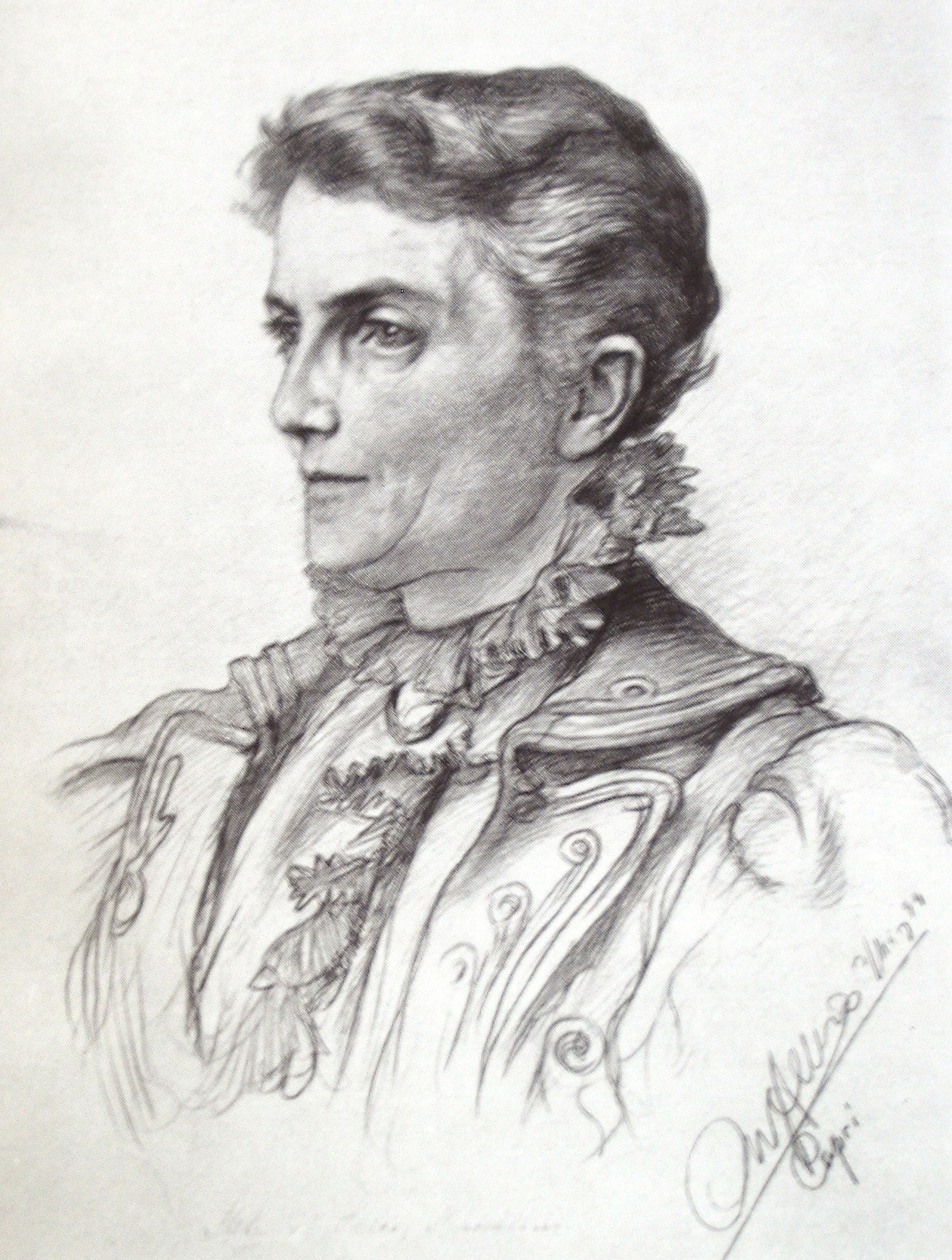
Meta von Salis, 1890s

- Meta von Salis (1855–1929), Swiss feminist and historian, schooled locally
- Liselotte Herrmann (1909–1938), Communist Resistance fighter in Nazi Germany, worked locally
- Friedrich Jung (1915–1997), doctor and leading academic and research pharmacologist in the GDR
- Carl, Duke of Württemberg (born 1936), head of the House of Württemberg
- Nico Stehr (born 1942), university professor on how we deal with Knowledge and information
- Helmut Willke (born 1945), sociologist who studies the effect of globalization on modern society
- Hubert Knoblauch (born 1959), sociologist, deal with Sociology of knowledge
- Tasos Zembylas (born 1962), philosopher and social scientist, local visiting professor from 2009

=== Sport ===
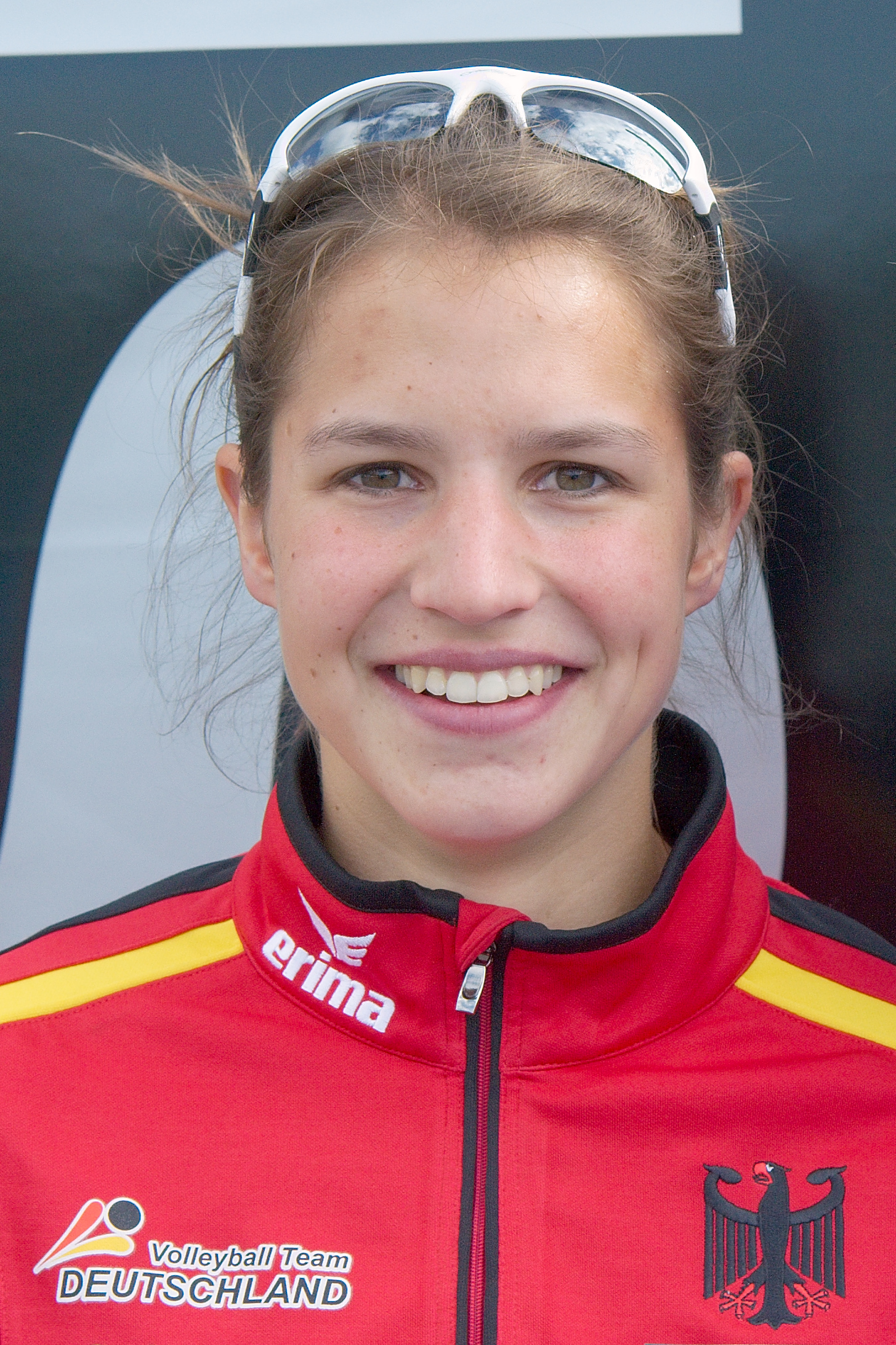
Chantal Laboureur, 2012

- brothers Jörg Diesch (born 1951) & Eckart Diesch (born 1954), sailors & team gold medallists at the 1976 Summer Olympics
- John Jurkovic (born 1967), former American football player currently employed as a US broadcaster
- Stefanie Rothweiler (born 1979), former yacht racer, competed at the 2004 & 2008 Summer Olympics
- Steffen Wohlfarth (born 1983), footballer, played 374 games
- Max Günthör (born 1985), volleyball player
- Chantal Laboureur (born 1990), retired volleyball and beach volleyball player
- Simon Zoller (born 1991), footballer, played over 360 games
- Liane Lippert (born 1998), cyclist
- Giulia Gwinn (born 1999), footballer, played over 130 games and 57 for Germany women
- Klara Bühl (born 2000), footballer played over 150 games and 62 for Germany women

== Twin towns – sister cities ==
Friedrichshafen is twinned with:

- Delitzsch, Germany
- Imperia, Italy
- Peoria, United States
- Polotsk, Belarus
- Saint-Dié-des-Vosges, France
- Sarajevo, Bosnia and Herzegovina

The relationships to the twin cities are supported by the local government together with twin city associations. In Friedrichshafen there had been founded the associations Freundeskreis Polozk, Peoria Club, Arbeitskreis S.Dié and Amici di Imperia.

Friedrichshafen has friendly relations with:

- Tsuchiura, Japan

== See also ==
- Dornier Consulting
