= Rianne Letschert =

Dutch politician and academic (born 1976)

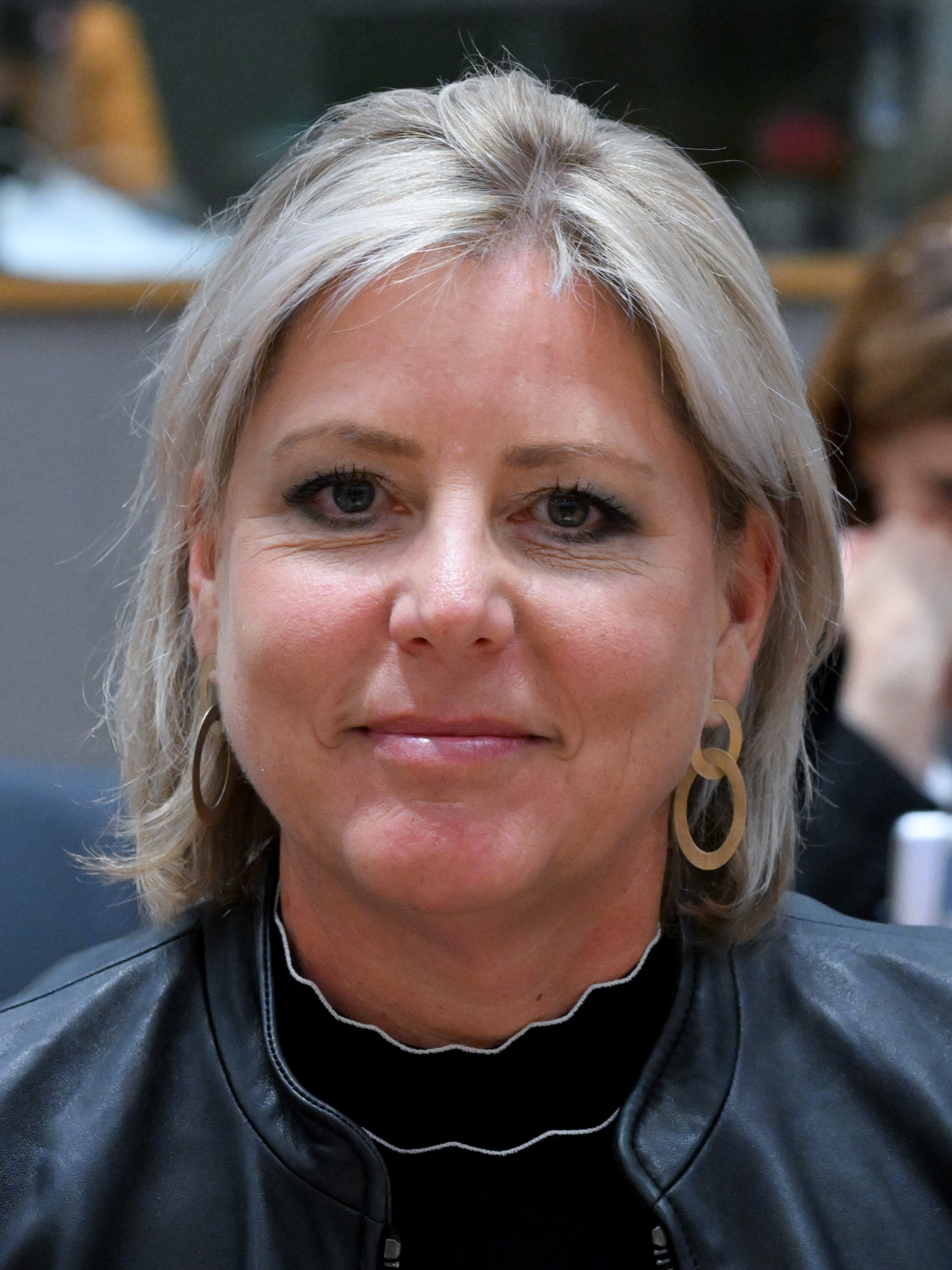
- Letschert in 2026

Minister of Education, Culture and Science
- Incumbent
- Assumed office 23 February 2026
- Prime Minister: Rob Jetten
- Preceded by: Gouke Moes

President of the Maastricht University
- In office 1 November 2021 – 23 February 2026
- Preceded by: Martin Paul
- Succeeded by: Pamela Habibović

Personal details
- Born: Rianne Monique Letschert; 13 September 1976 (age 50) Achterhoek, Netherlands
- Party: Democrats 66
- Spouse: Sander Kleikers (m. 2023)
- Children: 2
- Education: Tilburg University
- Occupation: Academic; professor

Rianne Monique Letschert (born 13 September 1976) is a Dutch law scholar who is the minister of education, culture and science in the Jetten cabinet since February 2026.

Letschert previously held positions in academia. She was a professor of victimology and international law at Tilburg University between March 2011 and September 2016. From September 2016 until February 2022 she was rector of Maastricht University. Between November 2021 and her appointment as minister she was president of the board of the same university.

== Career ==
Letschert was born in Doetinchem on 13 September 1976. Her parents were from Amsterdam. She moved at an early age to Stiphout in the municipality of Helmond. In Helmond she attended high school. Letschert studied law at Tilburg University, the University of Amsterdam and the University of Montpellier. She obtained her PhD at Tilburg University with a thesis titled The impact of minority rights mechanisms (2005), dealing with competing international organisations making policy on national minorities.

In March 2011 Letschert was appointed as professor to the new chair of victimology and international law at Tilburg University. Several years later Letschert contemplated leaving academia. In May 2015 she was awarded an 800,000 Euro grant by the Netherlands Organisation for Scientific Research and decided to continue. Her research focused on the impact of international tribunals on societies and individuals that have been confronted with human rights violations and international crimes. Apart from her position as professor she served as director of the International Victimology Institute Tilburg (INTERVICT). In 2016 Letschert was asked to become dean of the Law faculty of Tilburg University. However, on 1 September 2016 she was appointed as rector of Maastricht University. She therefore laid down her position as professor of victimology.

Letschert joined the De Jonge Akademie (Young Academy) of the Royal Netherlands Academy of Arts and Sciences in 2012. In April 2015 she became chairperson. Due to her appointment as rector magnificus of Maastricht University she was succeeded as chairperson by Rens Vliegenthart in June 2016. Letschert was a Schermer Fellow at the Netherlands Institute for Advanced Study in the period between February and June 2016. In November 2021 she became president of the board of Maastricht University, succeeding Martin Paul. In February 2022 Letschert laid down her role as rector. As president of the board Letschert was a vocal opponent of the proposed budget cuts by the Schoof cabinet to international students. In September 2025 she was elected to another term as president of the board. Upon her appointment as minister on 23 February 2026 her time in office ended.

== Political activity ==
After the 2018 Dutch municipal elections Letschert was formateur for the municipal executive of Maastricht.

During the 2021–2022 Dutch cabinet formation Letschert was proposed as minister of education by Democrats 66 (D66) but she declined the position in favor of remaining at Maastricht University.

After the 2025 general election Letschert was asked by D66 to become the second informateur of the 2025–2026 Dutch cabinet formation. In January 2026 it was announced that she was helping D66, CDA and the VVD form a minority government. During the formation process Letschert had two severe interventions in the process. On 9 January she forced the parties to settle on a coalition form. On 26 January she intervened again, threatening to leave, this time to make sure the final financial negotiations were settled. On 30 January 2026 Letschert presented her final report to the House of Representatives.

=== Minister ===
On 6 February 2026 D66 put forward Letschert as the candidate become the Minister of Education, Culture and Science in the Jetten cabinet. On 23 February 2026 the Jetten cabinet was installed and Letschert formally became minister. As minister Letschert would formally take charge of the culture portfolio, which in previous cabinets had been delegated to the state secretary of the ministry.

In mid-March 2026 Letschert's plan to discuss a compensation for students in the Council of Ministers did not go through as information had been leaked to the media in advance. Prime Minister Jetten had reinstated an old rule that if such a thing happened a proposal would not be discussed in the council. Letschert's plan was the first proposal to suffer from the reinstated rule. One week later the proposal with a compensation of 2100 euro per student passed in the council.

== Personal life ==
Letschert is married to Sander Kleikers since 2023. She has two children from a previous relationship.
