= Martin Paul =

Martin Paul may refer to:

- Martin Paul (footballer), English former professional footballer
- Martin Paul (professor), German clinical pharmacologist
