= Stefan Grimm =

German-British biologist and toxicologist

Stefan Grimm (1963–2014) was a German biologist and professor of toxicology at Imperial College London. He researched signalling cascades in the development of tumours.

Grimm was found dead in Northwood, Middlesex on 25 September 2014 after being told that he was "struggling to fulfil the metrics" of a professorial post by his head of department. The coroner described his death as "needless".

== Career ==
Grimm studied for his PhD in biology under the supervision of Patrick Bäuerle at the University of Tübingen in Germany, working on the role of NF-κB in cell transformation and apoptosis. After completing his studies in 1994, Grimm moved to the U.S. in 1995 to work as a postdoctoral fellow under Philip Leder at Harvard Medical School. At the genetics department there, he continued to work on NF-κB signalling pathways while also studying new technological approaches to analyse gene functionality.

In 1998, Grimm returned to Germany and launched his own research group at the Max Planck Institute of Biochemistry. He later co-founded a functional biology and drug discovery company, named Xantos Biomedicine AG, serving on its scientific advisory board until 2006.

In 2004, Grimm was appointed Professor of Toxicology at Imperial College London, where he made fundamental contributions to the understanding of the molecular and cellular mechanisms of apoptotic cell death in connection with the development of cancer. He also revealed a new class of genes – anticancer genes – which could specifically target human cancers.

Grimm's research programme focused primarily on apoptosis, signalling pathways, and tumourigenesis. Over his 20-year career, he published 50 articles in top journals, two books, and filed five patent applications.

== Death and events at Imperial College London ==
Grimm was found dead at his home in Middlesex on 25 September 2014, with typed notes next to his body. His inquest ruled that he took his life by asphyxiation. One month after his death, on 21 October, an email with the subject line "How Professors are treated at Imperial College", apparently set to deliver on a delay timer, was sent from the "professorstefangrimm" prefixed email address to senior members of the medical faculty.

In the email, Grimm describes how his head of department told him that he needed to obtain a programme grant, or else "start to give serious consideration as to whether [he is] performing at the expected level of a Professor at Imperial College." This was despite him already acquiring £135,000 in grant income and submitting the highest number of grant applications in the medical faculty.

In his last email, Grimm had this to say of the senior staff in his faculty:

These formidable leaders are playing an interesting game: They hire scientists from other countries to submit the work that they did abroad under completely different conditions for the Research Assessment that is supposed to gauge the performance of British universities. Afterwards they leave them alone to either perform with grants or being kicked out. Even if your work is submitted to this Research Assessment and brings in money for the university, you are targeted if your grant income is deemed insufficient. Those submitted to the research assessment hence support those colleagues who are unproductive but have grants. Grant income is all that counts here, not scientific output.

Grimm also criticised Imperial College London, which he complained was no longer acting like a university and instead likened to a business. He reasoned that within the institution, the "very few up in the hierarchy [profiteered while others] are milked for money, be it professors for their grant income or students who pay 100 pounds just to extend their write-up status".

The Rector of Imperial College, Alice Gast, gave credence to Grimm's analogy, when she described university professors as "really like small business owners [...] they have their own research and they have their research funding to look after."

On 1 December, David Colquhoun, an emeritus professor of pharmacology at University College London and long-time critic of managerialism and research assessment in British universities, wrote a blog post entitled "Publish and perish at Imperial College London: the death of Stefan Grimm". Colquhoun published both Grimm's email and the emails sent by his head of department. The post was viewed 196,000 times in the year after Grimm's death. The day after it was posted, Colquhoun's web server received so many page requests it failed.

Colquhoun described Imperial's performance targets as "a recipe for short term, unoriginal research. It's an incentive to cut corners... It is a prostitution of science."

On 4 December, Imperial College London issued a statement expressing sadness at the "tragic loss" of Professor Grimm and reporting that "senior colleagues have offered their deepest condolences to Stefan's family on behalf of the college and all those affected by this tragedy". The statement denied "claims appearing on the internet" that Grimm's work was "under formal review" or that he had been "given any notice of dismissal".

Imperial College London commissioned an internal review into its performance management procedures, commenting:

Professor Grimm had been under review in the informal process for nearly two years. His line manager was using this period to help Professor Grimm obtain funding or alternative work (the review panel saw evidence of the efforts made in this regard). The subsequent formal process would have involved a minimum of two formal meetings with time to improve in-between formal meetings before consideration would have been given to the termination of Professor Grimm's employment. Understandably there is a reluctance to move into formal hearings, particularly when the member of staff is hard working and diligent, but the formal stages would have provided more clarity to Professor Grimm on process and support through the written documentation, representation at meetings and HR involvement.

It is recommended that the new capability procedure and ordinance include greater clarity on timescales for informal action and how this might operate in different roles.

Colquhoun commented: "It seems to be absurd to describe...[the head of department's email]... as an attempt to 'help' Professor Grimm. It was a direct threat to the livelihood of a competent 51 year-old full professor. Having flow charts for the bullying would not have helped."
