= Freundeskreis Polozk =

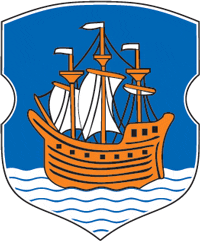
- Abbreviation: Freundskreis Polozk e.V.
- Formation: 21.June 1995
- Legal status: Not-for-profit, membership-based organisation
- Purpose: Fostering the relationship to twin town Polack in Belarus
- Location: Friedrichshafen, Bodenseekreis
- Region served: Germany
- Second chairman: Igor Veremyov Natallia Bachmann
- Website: www.freundeskreis-polozk.de

Freundeskreis Polozk is a German registered association in Friedrichshafen that manages relationship with sister cities.

== History ==
It was founded on the initiative of city councilor Rotraut Binder and citizen Karl Bachmann with the intention to establish a club to stimulate Friedrichshafen committed citizens to organize the new urban partnership between Friedrichshafen and the Belarusian city Polack.

In 1985, the regional council of Friedrichshafen identified Polack as a city in the Soviet Union with a comparable degree of destruction during the second world war and linked with it in 1990. In 1995 the association was founded. The demand was for war reparations. In 1996 and 2004 the group traveled to Polack, In 2011 Project Clear water Polozk was conducted. In 2013 Project 'Hört mit' ( hearing aids for Polack) was conducted. In 2015 25 Jjähriges Jubiläum der Städtepartnerschaft in Polozk was conducted. In 2018 the group cycled to Polack.

Friedrichshafen's other sister cities are Sarajevo/Bosnia and Herzegovina, Saint-Dié-des-Vosges/France, Delitzsch/Germany, Imperia/Italy and Peoria/Illinois/United States.

== Supraregional meaning ==
Because of the complex political situation and dictatorial leadership of president Alexander Lukashenko, European Union sanctions and the German government, and political pressure on Russian and Belarusian governments, the Minsk administration surrounding Lukashenko is fostering urban partnerships.

The association serves a supra-regional function for the projects they organise. The commitment was affirmed at the Sustainability Conference at Minsk, in June 2018. The trip covered. 2200 km in 10 days on a folding bike.

== Humanitarian projects ==
Freundeskreis Polack organized Warm Winter, Meeting lonesome people, Woman's help for women projects and supported projects together with the Belarusian association Strumok and Tschernobyl echo.

== Meetings ==
Citizens of the sister cities meet with the group. 13 train trips and 4 camper trips were organized since 1995.
