= Andrea Kern =

Andrea Kern (born 1968) is a professor of philosophy at Leipzig University.

== Life and works ==
Kern studied philosophy, German studies, film studies and theater at the Free University of Berlin (FU), the University of Paris and the Ruhr University Bochum. She received her doctorate from the FU in 1998. From 1997 to 1999 she was a research assistant at the University of Amsterdam. She was a visiting scholar at the University of Pittsburgh (1998/99) and the University of Chicago (2003/04). From 1999 to 2006 she was a research assistant at the University of Potsdam, where she completed her habilitation in 2004. From 2007 to 2009 she was Professor of Cultural Philosophy at the Brandenburg University of Technology. Since 2009, she has been teaching and researching at the Institute for the History of Philosophy at Leipzig University. Her research focuses on epistemology, philosophy of perception, skepticism, philosophical anthropology and aesthetics. She spent the academic year 2014/15 as a fellow at the Berlin Institute for Advanced Studies. For years, she has devoted herself to German Idealism.

== Selected publications ==
=== Monographs ===
- Kern, Andrea; Smyth, Daniel (2017-01-02), "Sources of Knowledge: On the Concept of a Rational Capacity for Knowledge", Sources of Knowledge, Harvard University Press, doi:10.4159/9780674973947, ISBN 978-0-674-97394-7
- Quellen des Wissens: zum Begriff vernünftiger Erkenntnisfähigkeiten (in German). Suhrkamp. 2006. ISBN 978-3-518-29386-7.

=== Editorials ===
- Conant, James; Kern, Andrea, eds. (2014-04-01), "Varieties of Skepticism: Essays after Kant, Wittgenstein, and Cavell", Varieties of Skepticism, De Gruyter, doi:10.1515/9783110336795, ISBN 978-3-11-033679-5
- Kern, Andrea; Menke, Christoph (2002). Philosophie der Dekonstruktion: zum Verhältnis von Normativität und Praxis (in German). Suhrkamp. ISBN 978-3-518-29207-5.

=== Articles ===
- Kern, Andrea (2019-01-09), "La Vie Humaine Et Son Concept", Le néoexistentialisme, Presses de l'Université Laval, pp. 101–118, doi:10.1515/9782763739557-005 (inactive 19 July 2025), ISBN 978-2-7637-3955-7
