= Florian Steger =

German medical historian

Florian Steger (born July 1, 1974, in Garmisch-Partenkirchen) is a German medical historian and medical ethicist.

== Life and impact ==
Steger studied human medicine, classical philology and history at the University of Würzburg and LMU Munich. Steger was a scholarship holder and is now a trust lecturer of the German National Academic Foundation. In 2002, he received his doctorate from the Ruhr University of Bochum with a thesis on ancient medicine. In 2003, he received the Bavarian Habilitation Award. In 2008, he habilitated in the history and ethics of medicine at the Medical Faculty of the University of Erlangen-Nuremberg and worked as a private lecturer in the history and ethics of medicine. From 2009 to 2014, he was a member of the Junge Akademie.

From 2011 to June 2016, Steger was W3 professor and director of the Institute for History and Ethics of Medicine at the University of Wittenberg. Since July 2016, he has been a university professor and director of the Institute of the History, Philosophy and Ethics of Medicine at the University of Ulm. Steger chairs the Ethics Committee of the University of Ulm and the Commission "Responsibility in Science". He is a member of the Senate.

== Main areas of work ==
His work focuses on questions of history, theory and ethics of medicine: research ethics, clinical ethics, good scientific practice; politicized medicine; cultural history of medicine since antiquity.

== Honors ==
- 2014: Leibniz Professorship at the University of Leipzig.
- 2018: Medal "Universitatis Lodziensis Amico" by the University of Łódź (Poland).
- 2018: honorary professor of the Semmelweis University, Budapest (Hungary)
- 2019: Corresponding member of the Saxon Academy of Sciences and Humanities
- 2019: Alexander von Humboldt Polish Honorary Research Scholarship (Foundation for Polish Science)
- 2020: corresponding member of the Göttingen Academy of Sciences and Humanities
- 2021: Honorary Professor of the Saint Petersburg State Pediatric Medical University (Russia)
- 2021: full member of the Heidelberg Academy of Sciences and Humanities
- 2022: corresponding member abroad of the Austrian Academy of Sciences.
- International visiting professorships: Riga (Latvia), Rijeka (Croatia), Łódź (Poland), and Moscow (Russia).

== Publications ==
Steger is the author and co-author of several books and articles on history, philosophy and ethics of medicine, including:

- (Ed.) Max Mohr (1891-1937): Korrespondenzen. Heidelberg: Universitätsverlag Winter, 2013 (Jahrbuch Literatur und Medizin. Beihefte. Band 1). ISBN 978-3-8253-6140-2.
- with Maximilian Schochow: Disziplinierung durch Medizin – Die geschlossene Venerologische Station in der Poliklinik Mitte in Halle (Saale) 1961 bis 1982 [Disciplining through medicine - Closed vereology ward in the Policlinic Mitte in Halle (Saale) 1961 to 1982]. Halle 2014, ISBN 978-3-95462-351-8.
- with Maximilian Schochow: Traumatisierung durch politisierte Medizin Geschlossene Venerologische Stationen in der DDR [Traumatization through politicized medicine. Closed venerological wards in the GDR]. Berlin 2015, ISBN 978-3-95466-240-1.
- with Carolin Wiethoff and Maximilian Schochow: Vertuschter Skandal – Die kontaminierte Anti-D-Prophylaxe in der DDR 1978/1979 und ihre Folgen [Covered-up scandal. The contaminated anti-D prophylaxis in the GDR and its aftermath]. Halle 2016, ISBN 978-3-95462-753-0.
- Asclepius: Cult and Medicine. Stuttgart 2018, ISBN 978-3-515-12197-2.
- with Maximilian Schochow: Wo ist mein Kind? Familien auf der Suche nach der Wahrheit. Ein Beitrag zur Aufarbeitung. Halle 2020, ISBN 978-3-96311-315-4.
- Max Mohr. Arzt und rastloser Literat. Regensburg 2020, ISBN 978-3-791-73075-2.
- Antike Medizin. Einführung und Quellensammlung. Stuttgart 2021, ISBN 978-3-7772-2120-5.
- (Ed.) Die Medizin von heute ist der Irrtum von morgen. Scharfzüngige Gedanken zur Medizin [Today's medicine is the tomorrow's error. Sharp-tongued concepts on medicine]. Wiesbaden 2017, ISBN 978-3-737-41054-0.
- (Ed.) Am Skalpell war noch Tinte. Literarische Medizin [At the scalpel was still ink]. Wiesbaden: marix Verlag 2018. ISBN 978-3-7374-1097-7
- with Carolin Wiethoff: Betriebsgesundheitswesen und Arbeitsmedizin im Bezirk Magdeburg [Occupational health care and occupational medicine in the district of Magdeburg]. Halle 2018, ISBN 978-3-9546-2946-6.
- with Marcin Orzechowski und Maximilian Schochow (Eds.): Pränatalmedizin. Ethische, juristische und gesellschaftliche Aspekte [Prenatal medicine. Ethic, legal and social aspects] (Angewandte Ethik – Medizin, 2). Freiburg 2018, ISBN 978-3-495-48956-7.
- with Manuela Dudeck (Eds.): Ethik in der Forensischen Psychiatrie und Psychotherapie [Ethics in forensic psychiatry and psychotherapy]. Berlin 2018, ISBN 978-3954663606.
- (Ed.) Jahrbuch Literatur und Medizin [Yearbook of Literature and Medicine]. Volume 11. Heidelberg 2019, ISBN 978-3-8253-6938-5.
- (Ed.) Diversität im Gesundheitswesen [Diversity in healthcare] (Angewandte Ethik - Medizin, 3). Freiburg 2019, ISBN 978-3-495-49028-0.
- with Jürgen Brunner (Eds.): Ethik in der psychotherapeutischen Praxis. Integrativ-fallorientiert-werteplural [Ethics in psychotherapeutic practice. Integrative-case oriented-value-plural]. Stuttgart 2019, ISBN 978-3-1703-2657-6.
- with Marcin Orzechowski, Giovanni Rubeis, Maximilian Schochow (Eds.): Migration and Medicine (Angewandte Ethik - Medizin, 4). Freiburg 2020, ISBN 978-3-495-49134-8.
