= Ruhr University Bochum =

Public university in Germany

- Ruhr-Universität Bochum
- Motto: Built to change
- Type: Public
- Established: 1962; 64 years ago
- Affiliations: UARuhr, DAAD, DFG, Utrecht Network, UNIC Network, MAUI Network, AEN Network, NOHA Network
- Budget: € 539.1 million
- Rector: Martin Paul
- Academic staff: 3,324
- Administrative staff: 2,378
- Students: 42,425
- Undergraduates: 22,458
- Postgraduates: 9,814
- Doctoral students: 3,619
- Other students: 7,223 international students
- Location: Bochum, North Rhine-Westphalia, Germany; 51°26′38″N 7°15′42″E
- Campus: 1,112 acres (450 ha); Urban/Suburban
- Colors: RUB-Blau, RUB-Grün
- Website: www.ruhr-uni-bochum.de

The Ruhr University Bochum (German: Ruhr-Universität Bochum, RUB) is a public research university located in the southern hills of the central Ruhr area, Bochum, Germany. It was founded in 1962 as the first new public university in Germany after World War II. Instruction began in 1965.

The Ruhr-University Bochum is one of the largest universities in Germany and part of the Deutsche Forschungsgemeinschaft, the most important German research funding organization.

The University of Bochum was one of the first universities in Germany to introduce international bachelor's and master's degrees, which replaced the traditional German Diplom and Magister. Except for a few special cases, such as medicine, these degrees are offered by all faculties of the Ruhr-University. Currently, the university offers a total of 184 different study programs from all academic fields represented at the university.

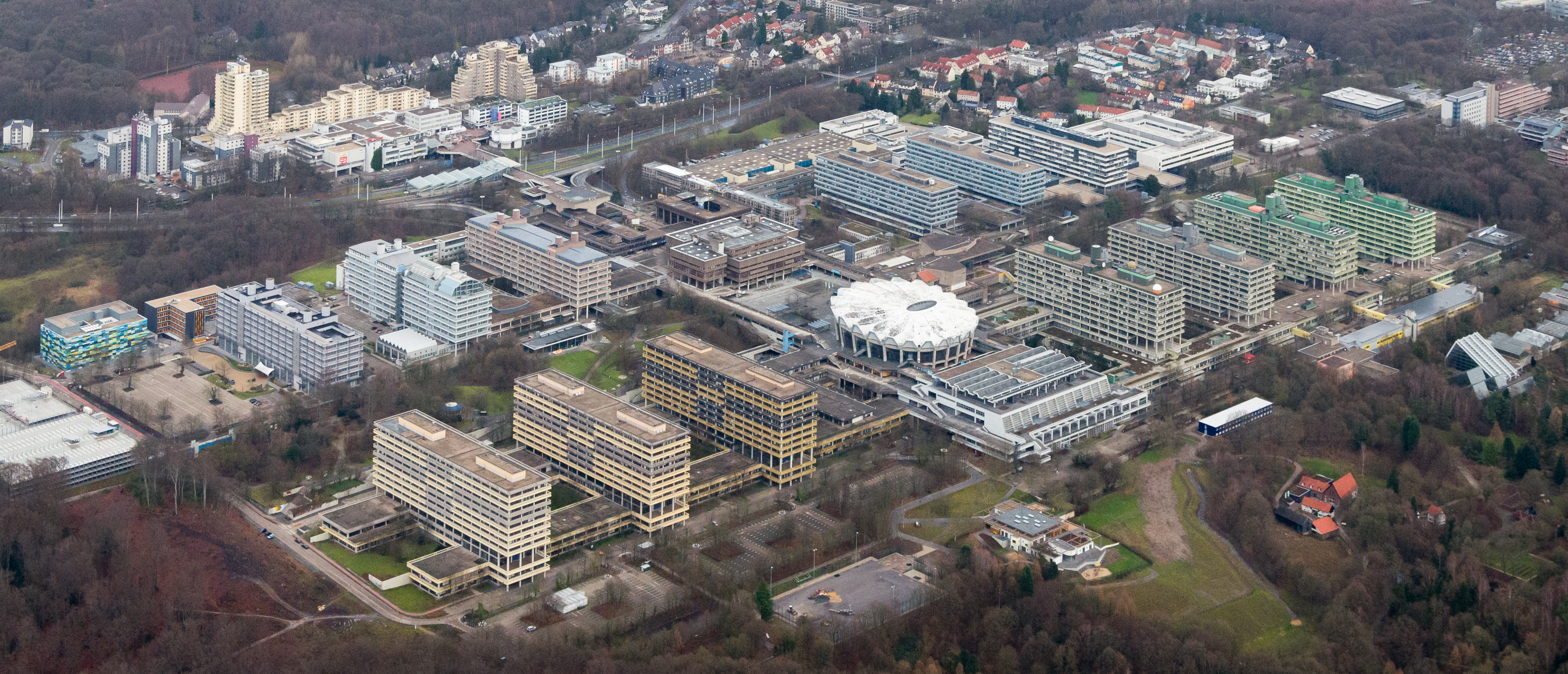
Aerial view of Ruhr-University (2014)

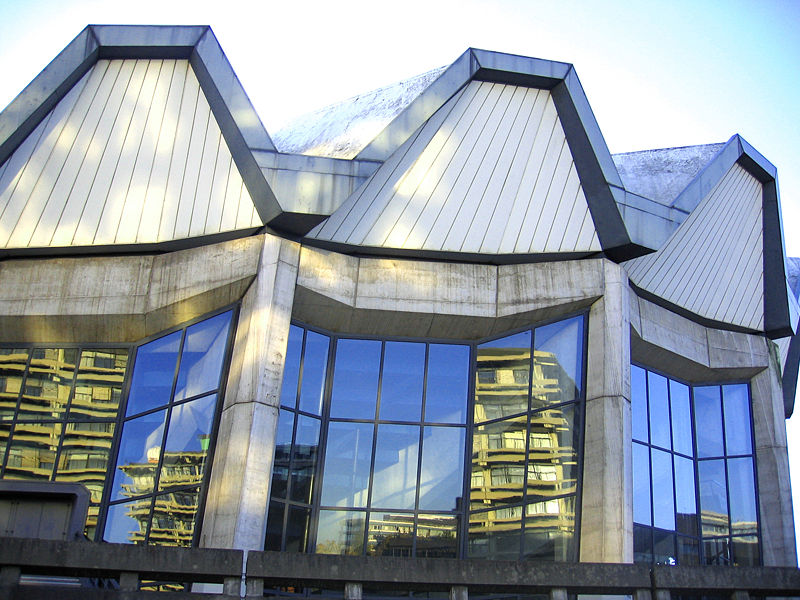
Ruhr-University, Main Lecture Hall, Audimax

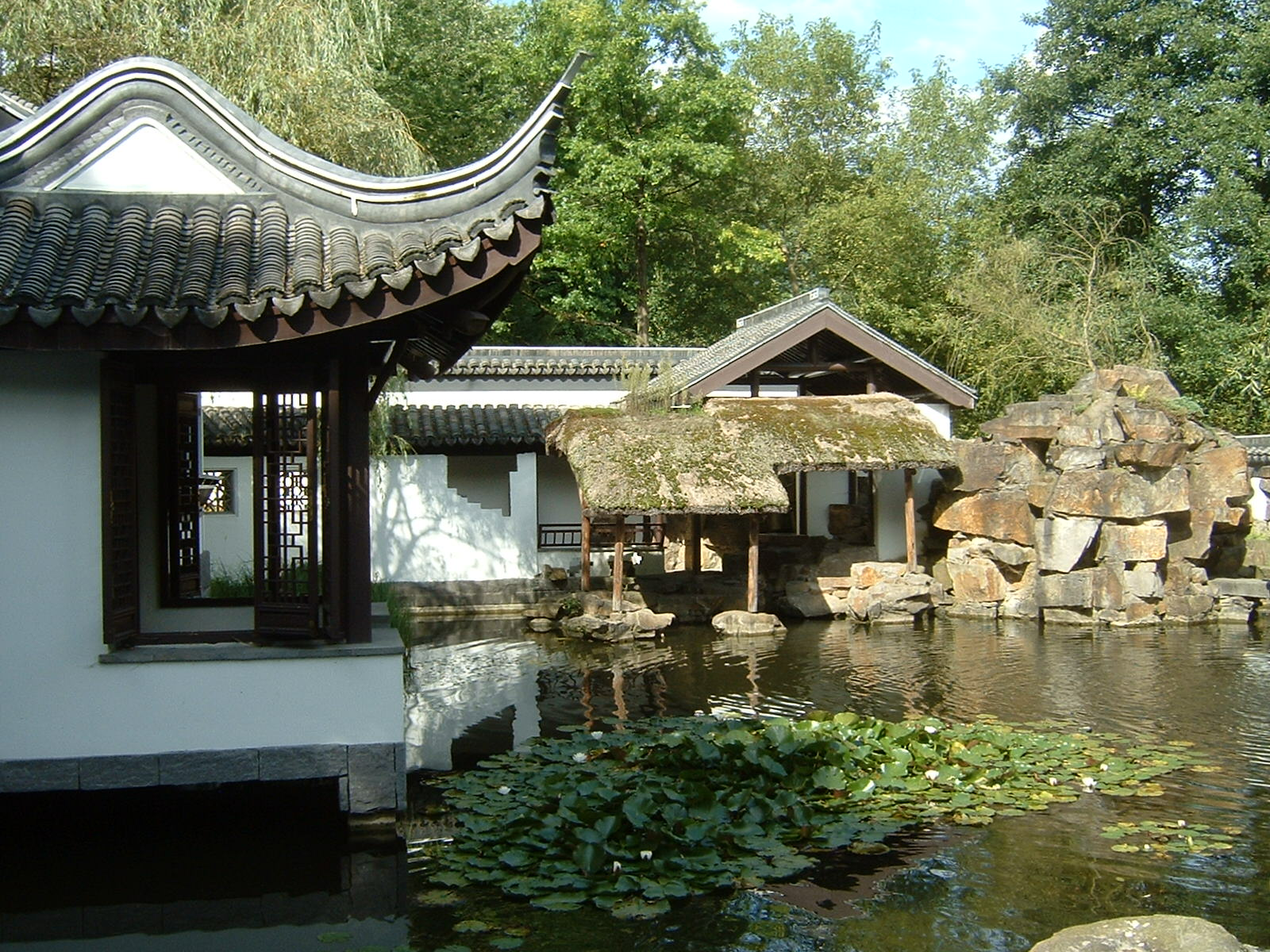
Ruhr-University, Chinese Garden (located within the Botanical Garden)

== Facilities ==
Unlike many older German universities, the buildings of Ruhr-University are all centralized on one campus, located south of Bochum city. The Faculty of Medicine includes several university clinics that are located at different centres in Bochum and the Ruhr area. A major facility for patient care is the University Hospital/Knappschaftskrankenhaus in the district Langendreer of Bochum. Internationally renowned experts in their respective fields include professors Wolff Schmiegel in oncology and Burkhard Dick in ophthalmology. The centralized university campus architecture is comprised almost exclusively of the 1960s architecture style referred to as brutalism, consisting of 14 almost identical high-rise buildings. One striking feature of these buildings is that although their roofs are all at the same apparent height (sky level), the absolute heights of the buildings vary in accordance with their placement on the undulating landscape in which the university is located: the campus is at the edge of a green belt on high ground adjacent to the Ruhr valley.

The arrangement of the buildings and the (concrete) paths and bridges between them was originally meant to resemble a "harbour of knowledge", with the buildings symbolising vessels, by architect Helmut Hentrich.

The campus has undergone heavy modernisation and extension efforts, including the construction and refurbishment of several buildings. Some of the original 1960s buildings are to be rebuilt, instead of refurbished, due to PCB contamination. The overall campus concept envisions a modern facility and the placement of Bochum as a "knowledge city".

== Organization ==
Ruhr-University is financed and administered by the state of North Rhine-Westphalia. Currently, 42,718 students are enrolled, and the university employs around 5,600 staff (411 of which are professors), making it one of the ten largest universities in Germany as of 2014. Kurt Biedenkopf, who later became prime minister of the state of Saxony, was rector of the university from 1967 to 1969.

The university is organized into twenty-one different faculties. These are:

- Faculty of Protestant Theology
- Faculty of Catholic Theology
- Faculty of Philosophy, Education and Journalism
- Faculty of History (including the departments of history, art history and archaeological sciences)
- Faculty of Philology
- Faculty of Law
- Faculty of Economics
- Faculty of Social science
- Faculty of East Asian studies
- Faculty of Sports science
- Faculty of Psychology
- Faculty of Civil and environmental engineering
- Faculty of Mechanical engineering
- Faculty of Electrical engineering and information technology
- Faculty of Mathematics
- Faculty of Physics and astronomy
- Faculty of Geosciences
- Faculty of Chemistry and biochemistry
- Faculty of Biology and biotechnology
- Faculty of Medicine
- Faculty of Computer science

ECUE - European Culture and Economy

Interdisciplinary institutions

- Interdisciplinary Centre for Advanced Materials Simulation (ICAMS)
- International Graduate School of Neuroscience
- Institute for International Law of Peace and Armed Conflict (IFHV)
- Center for Religious Studies (CERES)

== Rankings ==
University rankings

Overall – Global & National
QS World 2024	375	20
THE World 2024	251–300	25–31
ARWU World 2023	301–400	20–24

In the QS World University Rankings for 2024, the university was ranked 375th globally and 20th nationally. Meanwhile, the Times Higher Education World University Rankings for 2024 positioned the university in a range between 251st and 300th worldwide, and between 25th and 31st in the national ranking. Similarly, in the 2023 ARWU list, the university placed between 301st and 400th globally and between 20th and 24th nationally.

QS Subject Ranking 2023
Subject	Global	National
Arts & Humanities	N/A	N/A
Theology, Divinity and Religious Studies	51–100	7–10
History	201–230	13–14
Philosophy	101–150	▼8–12
Engineering and Technology	N/A	N/A
Engineering – Mechanical	▲401–450	14–15
Life Sciences & Medicine	N/A	N/A
Psychology	201–250	▲10–15
Natural Sciences	N/A	N/A
Materials Sciences	201–250	10–12

THE Subject Ranking 2023
Subject	Global	National
Arts & humanities	▼176–200	15–17
Education	▲301–400	▲18–24
Social sciences	▲301–400	▲22–26
Computer science	▲101–125	▼9–10
Engineering	▼201–250	10–12
Clinical & health	301–400	▼21–25
Life sciences	▼301–400	27–32
Physical sciences	301–400	▼27–30
Psychology	▼85	▲6

ARWU Subject Ranking 2022
Subject	Global	National
Natural Sciences
Mathematics	▼201–300	▼12–18
Physics	201–300	▲13–23
Chemistry	101–150	▼6–11
Earth Sciences	201–300	17–23
Engineering
Mechanical Engineering	201–300	▲8–12
Electrical & Electronic Engineering	401–500	▼16–17
Chemical Engineering	301–400	▲6–12
Materials Science & Engineering	301–400	▲16–21
Nanoscience & Nanotechnology	301–400	▲18–27
Energy Science & Engineering	201–300	▲8–10
Metallurgical Engineering	▼34	2
Life Sciences
Biological Sciences	201–300	▼20–30
Human Biological Sciences	201–300	▲27–30
Agricultural Sciences	401–500	26–30
Medical Sciences
Clinical Medicine	301–400	▲23–30
Public Health	301–400	▲12–22
Medical Technology	201–300	▲24–30
Pharmacy & Pharmaceutical Sciences	101–150	▲10–14
Social Sciences
Statistics	76–100	▲1–3
Education	▼401–500	▼20–23
Psychology	151–200	▼12–17
Business Administration	301–400	11–15

== Points of interest ==
- Botanischer Garten der Ruhr-Universität Bochum, a botanical garden with Chinese garden
- Hegel-Archiv, the archives of the German philosopher Georg Wilhelm Friedrich Hegel
- Medical historical collection of the Ruhr-University
- Art collection, including Antiquity Museum of the Ruhr-University
- Audimax and Klais-Organ of the Ruhr-University
- Musisches Zentrum (Artistic center)

== Notable alumni ==
- Ali Atalan: Kurdish-German politician of Yazidi faith, former member of the Landtag of North Rhine-Westphalia and the Turkish Parliament.
- Bernd Baumann: Economist and politician, serving as a member of the Bundestag from Hamburg since 2017.
- Hans-Paul Bürkner: German management consultant, serving as Global Chair Emeritus of the Boston Consulting Group.
- Andreas Floer: German mathematician known for his contributions to symplectic topology and the invention of Floer homology.
- Daniel Jasinski: German discus thrower, Olympic bronze medalist in 2016.
- Anke Kaysser-Pyzalla, CEO of German Aerospace Center, former president of the Technical University of Braunschweig.
- Zdzisław Krasnodębski: Polish sociologist, philosopher, and politician, serving as a Member of the European Parliament since 2014.
- Andrea Kern (born 1968), professor of philosophy at Leipzig University
- Norbert Lammert: Politician, served as the 12th President of the Bundestag from 2005 to 2017.
- Sylvia Löhrmann: German politician of the Green Party.
- Reinhard Marx: Cardinal in the Catholic Church, serving as the Archbishop of Munich and Freising.
- Elmar Nass: German Catholic theologian, priest, social economist, and academic at the Cologne University of Catholic Theology (KHKT).
- Hartmut Neven: Scientist working in quantum computing, computer vision, and robotics; Vice President of Engineering at Google, leading the Quantum Artificial Intelligence Lab.
- Melanie Raabe: German novelist and journalist.
- Maximilian Reinelt: Rower and physician, Olympic gold medalist in 2012 and silver medalist in 2016.
- Jan-Michael "Jamiri" Richter: German comic artist.
- Svenja Schulze: Politician, currently serving as the Minister for Economic Cooperation and Development in Germany.
- Erwin Sellering: Politician, served as the 4th Minister President of Mecklenburg-Vorpommern from 2008 to 2017.
- Stefan Sommer, former CEO of ZF Friedrichshafen.
- Florian Steger, medical historian and ethicist.
- Katrin Suder: Physicist and management consultant, served as State Secretary in the Federal Ministry of Defense from 2014 to 2018.
- Sadeq Tabatabaei, writer, journalist, TV host, university professor at the University of Tehran and politician.
- Afu Thomas (Thomas Derksen), internet celebrity.
- Oliver Wittke: German politician and geographer.
- Sonja Zekri: German journalist and author, focusing on topics such as the Near East, Eastern Europe, culture, and religion.

== See also ==
- List of colleges and universities
- ConRuhr
- Nina Babel
