= Interdisciplinary Centre for Advanced Materials Simulation =

Research centre at Ruhr University Bochum, Germany

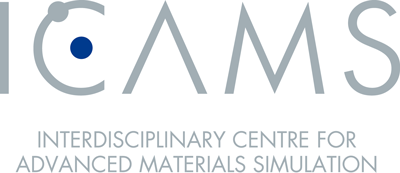
ICAMS Logo

The Interdisciplinary Centre for Advanced Materials Simulation (ICAMS) is a research centre at the Ruhr University Bochum, Germany.

ICAMS focuses on the development and application of a new generation of simulation tools for multi-scale materials modelling with the aim of reducing development cost and time for new materials. Within the approach taken by ICAMS, the different length scales that are relevant for materials - from the atomic structure to macroscopic properties of materials - are bridged by an interdisciplinary team of scientists from engineering, materials science, chemistry, physics and mathematics.

ICAMS is linked to the Institute of Materials (Ruhr University Bochum), the Department of Ferrous Metallurgy (RWTH Aachen University, Germany), the Institute of Materials Physics (Westphalian Wilhelms University) and the Max Planck Institute for Iron Research GmbH (Düsseldorf, Germany).

The institute hosts the international master's programme "Materials Science and Simulation".

== Structure ==
The structure of ICAMS reflects the hierarchical structure of materials. ICAMS hosts three departments:

- Atomistic Modelling and Simulation,
- Scale-Bridging Thermodynamic and Kinetic Simulation,
- Micromechanical and Macroscopic Modelling

and three independent research group:

- High-Performance Computing in Materials Science
- Scale-Bridging Simulation of Functional Composites
- Materials Informatics and Data Science

Their research is complemented by four external Advanced Study Groups:

- Modelling (Max Planck Institute for Iron Research GmbH),
- Input Data and Validation (Ruhr University Bochum),
- Processing and Characterization (RWTH Aachen University),
- Diffusion and Microstructure Analysis (Westphalian Wilhelms University).
