= Elmar Nass =

Catholic priest and theologian

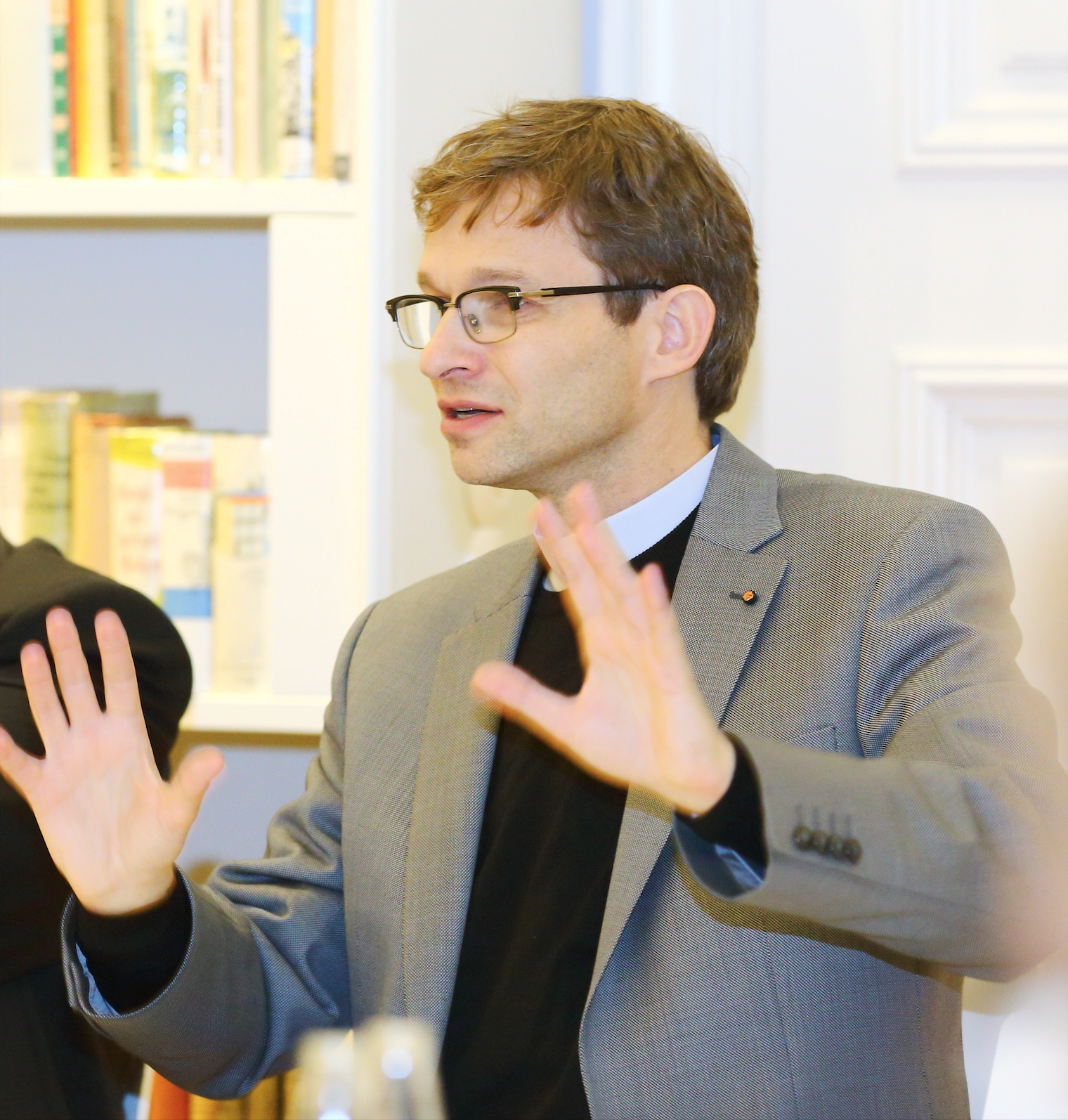
Elmar Nass, 2018

Elmar Nass (born 5 July 1966 in Kempen, Germany) is a Catholic priest, theologian and a teacher of economic ethics. He holds the chair of Christian Social Sciences and Social Dialogue at the Cologne University of Catholic Theology (KHKT).

== Life ==
Nass studied Catholic theology, philosophy and social sciences in Bonn, Rome and Trier. After his studies as an alumnus of the Collegium Germanicum et Hungaricum, Rome, he was ordained priest there in 1994. Nass received his doctorate first in Christian Social Sciences from University of Trier (2002), then in Social Policy and Social Economics at the Ruhr University, Bochum (2006).

After teaching at the Faculty of Philosophy of the University of Cologne (2006), he was a lecturer at the Chair of Christian Social Teaching and Pastoral Sociology at the University of Bonn from 2007 to 2012. He also serves as a vicar of the Aachen Cathedral since 2007. Teaching positions at the Faculty of Philosophy at RWTH Aachen University followed from 2012 to 2021. He was Professor of Economic and Social Ethics at the private Wilhelm Löhe University of Applied Sciences in Fürth from 2013 to 2020, where he directed the Wilhelm Löhe Ethics Institute from 2015 to 2020.

In 2014 he presented his habilitation-thesis at the Faculty of Philosophy at RWTH Aachen and received the venia legendi for Christian economic and social ethics. Since 2021, he holds the chair of Christian Social Sciences and Social Dialogue at KHKT Cologne. He has also served as vice rector of KHKT since 2021.

Elmar Nass’s main area of teaching and research is social ethics with a focus on economic ethics. His research areas include issues of social justice, the social market economy, ethics of order and leadership, war and peace, as well as digitalization and technology ethics. Nass also draws attention to ethical positions on the monetary crisis, emphasizing subsidiarity over solidarity

== Selected works ==
- Der humangerechte Sozialstaat (Untersuchungen zur Ordnungstheorie und Ordnungspolitik, Band 51), Mohr Siebeck, 2006, ISBN 978-3-16-149118-4
- With Alfred Schüller, Joseph Kardinal Höffner: Wirtschaft, Währung, Werte. Die Euro(pa)krise im Lichte der Katholischen Soziallehre, Ferdinand Schöningh, Paderborn 2014, ISBN 978-3-506-77868-0
- Handbuch Führungsethik: Teil I: Systematik und maßgebliche Denkrichtungen (Dynamisch Leben gestalten / Innovative Unternehmensführung in der Sozial- und Gesundheitswirtschaft, Band 7), Kohlhammer 2017, ISBN 3-17-032204-4
- Utopia Christiana – Vom Kirche- und Christsein heute, LIT Verlag 2018, ISBN 978-3-643-14221-4
- Christian Social Ethics Under Gender Paradigm? An examination of theological connectivity, In: Ordo Socialis 2018.
- New Paradigm for Catholic Social Ethics. Ecological Humanism and Market Criticism in the Encyclical Laudato Si’, In: Ordo Socialis 2018.
- With C.-H. Mayer, W. M. George: „Care for the Common Home“: Responses to Pope Francis’s Encyclical Letter. In: Journal of Religion and Health 59: 416–427.
- Christliche Sozialethik: Orientierung, die Menschen (wieder) gewinnt (Ethik – Grundlagen und Handlungsfelder, Band 13), Kohlhammer 2020, ISBN 978-3-17-037056-2
- Behavioral Economical Ethics. The Catholic Contribution to a New Chapter in Economic Ethics. In: Catholic Social Science Review 25: 181-196, doi:10.5840/cssr20202539
- Christian Social Ethics, Rowman & Littlefield 2022, ISBN 978-1-5381-6526-3.
- The Social Danger of Christian Fundamentalism: Plea for a Coalition of Church and Secular Society. In: The Palgrave Handbook of Global Social Change, Cham: Springer International Publishing, pp. 1–15, doi:10.1007/978-3-030-87624-1_136-1, ISBN 978-3-030-87624-1, 2022.
