= Hubert Knoblauch =

German sociologist (born 1959)

- Born: 21 March 1959 (age 67); Friedrichshafen
- Education: University of Konstanz
- Scientific career
- Fields: Sociology
- Workplaces: Technische Universität Berlin; University of Zurich
- Thesis: Die Welt der Wünschelrutengänger und Pendler (1991)
- Doctoral advisor: Thomas Luckmann

Hubert Knoblauch (born March 21, 1959) is a German sociologist. He is known for his work on Sociology of knowledge, Sociology of Religion, Qualitative research and Videography.

== Biography ==
Knoblauch has a degree in sociology from the University of Konstanz where he also did his PhD. He did research and taught among others at the University of California at Berkeley, King's College London, the Universities of Konstanz, Zurich, Bern and Vienna. From 1996 he was a Heisenberg scholar of the German Research Association (DFG). In 2000 he became Professor in Religious Studies at the Theological Faculty of the University of Zurich. Since 2002 he is Professor of General Sociology/Theories of Modern Societies at Technische Universität Berlin.

== Works ==
His texts are published in 10 languages and cover the sociology of knowledge, communication, contemporary religion, death and dying and video analysis. He is a member of the Council of the DGS (German Society for Sociology) and has held many positions within the ESA, e.g. Chair of the RN Sociology of Culture.

Hubert Knoblauch is spokesperson for the Collaborative Research Center 1265: Re-Figuration of Spaces at Technische Universität Berlin and for the Research Network Social Theory of the European Sociological Association (2019–2021). He is an elected member of the Executive Board of Research of the Deutsche Gesellschaft für Soziologie, editor of the series "Knowledge, Communication and Society" (Routledge), and on the board of the SFB "Affective Societies" (2015–2019). He is head of the "Sociology" section of the Görres Society for the Cultivation of Science and editor of the series "Sozialwissenschaftliche Abhandlungen" of the Görres Society. He is also editor of several journals ("FQS", "Human Studies", "Qualitative Research", "Religion and Society", "sozialer sinn" and "Schuetzean Studies") and editor of the series "Wissen, Kommunikation und Gesellschaft" at Springer Verlag, as well as Consulting Editor of the series "Qualitative Sociology Review".

== Research methodology and theoretical orientation ==
In his research Knoblauch focusses on various fields within theoretical and empirical sociology. He developed his own approach to the investigation of social interaction called focused ethnography. In contrast to “classic” ethnography this does not include prolonged stays in foreign cultures, but relies on video recordings of specialized fields within the researchers own society. The combination between video analysis and focused ethnography was elaborated as “videography”. Another major field of his work is the sociology of religion, where he advocates for a broad understanding of the role of religion in modern society. Building on Luckmann's “invisible religion”, he was one of the first to analyse the new forms of spirituality and developed the idea of a mediatized, event- and experience based “popular religion”. Next to his contrition in re-establishing the sociology of knowledge in German speaking sociology, communication was a crucial reference point for his work. While he analysed communication processes already in his dissertation on dowsing and divination, in his habilitation thesis “Kommunikationskultur: Die kommunikative Konstrutkion kultureller Kontexte” (translation: Communication Culture: The Communicative Construction of Cultural Contexts) he elaborated a theoretical framework which came to be known as “Communicative Constructivism”. Based on “The Social Construction of Reality” by Peter L. Berger and Thomas Luckmann, this approach includes bodily performances and material “objectivations” as “the missing analytical link which allows one to turn social into communicative action”. Without being reduced to speech acts, “communicative action" becomes “the basic process in the social construction of reality”.

== Publications (selection) ==
- H. Knoblauch. The Communicative Construction of Reality. London/New York: Routledge. 2020
- H. Knoblauch, M. Pfadenhauer (eds.) Social Constructivism as Paradigm. The Legacy of the Social Construction of Reality. London: Routledge. 2018
- H. Knoblauch, R. Tuma and B. Schnettler. Videography. Introduction to Interpretive Videoanalysis of social Situations. Frankfurt/Main, Bern, Bruxelles, New York, Oxford, Warzawa, Wien. 2014
- H. Knoblauch, R. Tuma and M. Jacobs (eds.) Culture, Communication, and Creativity. Reframing the Relations of Media, Knowledge, and Innovation in Society. Frankfurt, Bern, Brussels, Oxford, New York, Warsaw, Vienna: Peter Lang. 2014.
- H. Knoblauch. Communicative Constructivism and Mediatization. In: Communication Theory 23(3) (2013), p. 297-315.
- H. Knoblauch. Powerpoint, Communication, and the Knowledge Society. New York: Cambridge University Press. 2013.[3]
- H. Knoblauch. Mabni Jameh Shenasi Marefat (translated into Persian by Keramatollah Rasekh): Teheran, Nashar Ney (978-964-185-234-6) 2010.
- H. Knoblauch. Sociology of Knowledge (“Wissenssoziologie” (German)). Konstanz: Universitätsverlag Konstanz: UTB.
- H. Knoblauch. Popular Religion. („Populäre Religion“). Frankfurt/ New York 2009.
- H. Knoblauch, A. Baer, E. Laurier, S. Petschke, B. Schnettler (eds.). Visual Analysis. New Developments in the Interpretative Analysis of Video and Photography. Forum: Qualitative Social Research, 9(3) (2008).
- H. Knoblauch, B. Schnettler, J. Raab,. H.-G. Soeffner (eds.) Video Analysis. Methodology and Methods. Qualitative Audiovisual Data Analysis in Sociology. Frankfurt am Main. Berlin. Bern. Bruxelles. New York. Oxford. Wien: Peter Lang (2. Auflage 2009).
- H. Knoblauch, U. Flick, C. Maeder: Qualitative Methods in Europe: The Variety of Social Research. Sonderheft von Forum Qualitative Sozialforschung/ Forum Qualitative Social Research 6/3 (2006) http://www.qualitative-research.net/fqs-texte/3-05/05-3-34-e.htm
- H. Knoblauch. Sociologija religije. Zagreb: Demetra Verlag 2004.
- H. Knoblauch (ed.). Europe and the Invisible Religion. Special Volume of Social Compass 50,3 (2003).
- H. Knoblauch. Qualitative Religious Research. („Qualitative Religionsforschung.“ German.) Paderborn, München, Wien, Zürich: Ferdinand Schöningh (UTB).
- H. Knoblauch, H. Kotthoff (eds.), Verbal Art across Cultures. The Aesthetic and Proto-Aesthetic Forms of Communication. Tübingen: Gunter Narr 2001.
