= Philipp Riederle =

German author, consultant and keynote speaker

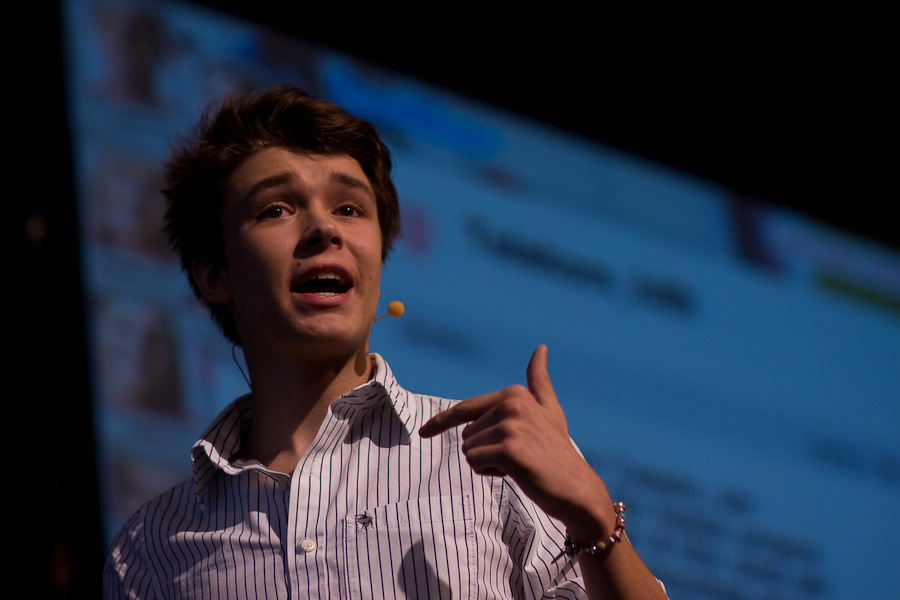
- Riederle at a speech in 2010
- Born: October 9, 1994 (age 32); Munich, Germany
- Education: University of Oxford (M.Sc., 2023); Zeppelin University (B.A., 2020)
- Occupations: Author; Consultant; Keynote Speaker
- Writing career
- Notable awards: Digital Minds of Germany (awarded by the Federal Ministry of Education and Research (Germany)); SPIEGEL-Bestseller book author
- Website: www.riederle.de/

Philipp Riederle (born October 9, 1994, in Munich) is a German author, consultant and keynote speaker. At the age of 13 he became famous with his podcast “Mein iPhone und Ich…” (My iPhone and me), with which he reached over one million viewers each year.

== Early life ==
Philipp Riederle was born in Munich in 1994 as the son of the engineer Martin Riederle and attended the Dossenberger-Gymnasium in Günzburg. Alongside his time in High School, he ran several projects that made him known on the Internet using the pseudonym "Phipz".

== Career ==
In April 2008, he launched his podcast “My iPhone and I…” in which he shared his experiences with the Apple iPhone, presented mobile apps and explained how to hack the device. This made him one of the most successful podcasters in Germany. He produced the episodes using the simplest equipment in his children's room at his parents’ house.

The increasing number of downloads as well as the podcasts viewers feedback led Philipp Riederle to the decision to set up his own company. In 2010, at the age of fifteen, he founded the media production company "Phipz Media UG" to market his business. He set up a professional studio with HD camera equipment and green screen technology in his grandparents' basement. In this added he started a second podcast called “Mein iPad und Ich…” (My iPad and me).

Since 2009, Philipp Riederle gives regularly speeches on topics such as digital media, the digital transformation and the digital native generation. He works with companies to develop and improve their digital competences.

Besides numerous publications in local and national newspapers and magazines and interviews on radio, Riederle is also a regular guest in several TV shows such as "Talking Germany" on Deutsche Welle, "Die Harald Schmidt Show" on Sky, “Pelzig hält sich” on ZDF, "Nachtcafe" on SWR and morning shows on Sat.1 and ZDF.

2013 at the age of 18 he published his first book with the title “Wer wir sind und was wir wollen” (“Who we are and what we want") which climbed the SPIEGEL bestseller list for four weeks. In April 2017 his second book “Wie wir arbeiten und was wir fordern” (“How we work and what we demand") was published.

In August 2018, Riederle was appointed to the Advisory Board “Digital Economy" of the Ministry of Economy, Innovation, Digitization and Energy of NRW.

Philipp Riederle graduated with distinction from Zeppelin University in December 2020. He holds a degree in “Sociology, Politics & Economics". In 2023, he obtained a Masters of Science in "Social Sciences of the Internet" at the Oxford Internet Institute, University of Oxford.

Since 2023, he works towards a PhD at Oxford Internet Institute, University of Oxford on the topic of distributing digital platform power.

== Awards ==
As part of the “Science Year 2014” the Federal Ministry of Education and Research of the German Government and the German Informatics Society, Philipp Riederle was honored with the German Digital Minds Award. The award is given to those who advance digital development in Germany with their ideas and projects.

In July 2017, Philipp Riederle received the award “Certified Speaking Professional" (CSP) from the National Speakers Association. The CSP is regarded as the highest, worldwide recognized quality award for full-time speakers.

== Publications ==
- Philipp Riederle: Who we are and what we want (German), Droemer Knaur, München 2013, ISBN 978-3-426-78611-6
- Philipp Riederle: How we work and what we demand (German), Droemer Knaur, München 2017, ISBN 978-3-426-27729-4
