= Immenstaad am Bodensee =

- Municipality
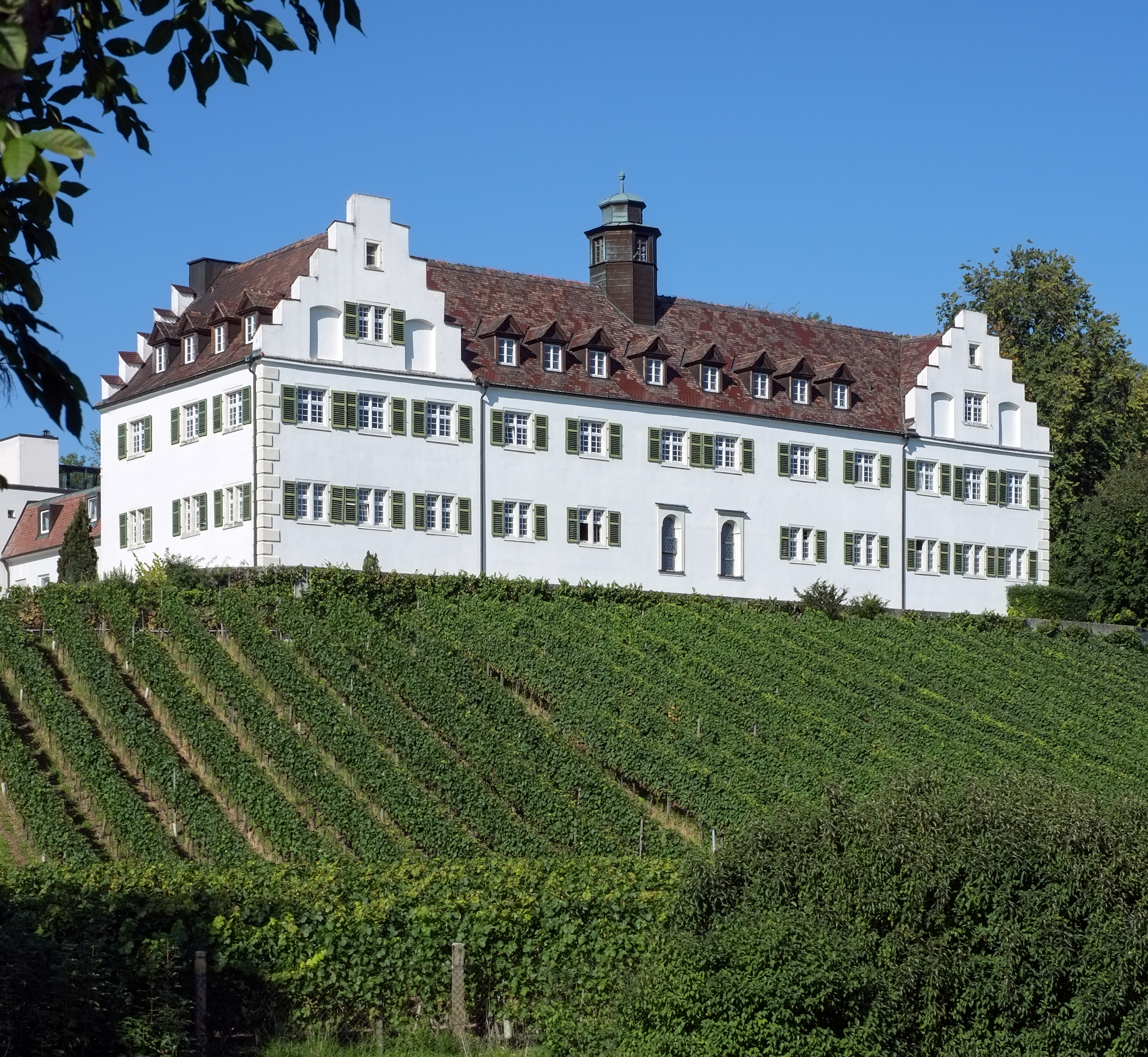
- Manor house Hersberg, Immenstaad am Bodensee

- Coat of arms

- Location of Immenstaad am Bodensee within Bodenseekreis district
- Interactive map of Immenstaad am Bodensee
- Location within Germany Location within Baden-Württemberg
- Coordinates: 47°40′N 09°22′E
- Country: Germany
- State: Baden-Württemberg
- Admin. region: Tübingen
- District: Bodenseekreis

Government
  - Mayor (2017–25): Johannes Henne (CDU)

Area
  - Total: 9.26 km^{2} (3.58 sq mi)
- Elevation: 403 m (1,322 ft)

Population (2025-12-31)
  - Total: 6,434
  - Density: 695/km^{2} (1,800/sq mi)
- Time zone: UTC+01:00 (CET)
  - Summer (DST): UTC+02:00 (CEST)
- Postal codes: 88090
- Dialling codes: 07545
- Vehicle registration: FN
- Website: www.immenstaad.de

Immenstaad am Bodensee is a municipality in Baden-Württemberg, Germany, on the north shore of Lake Constance (called the Bodensee in German) near the Austrian and Swiss borders. It is not to be confused with the similarly named town of Immenstadt, approximately 85 km East in Bavaria.

== History ==
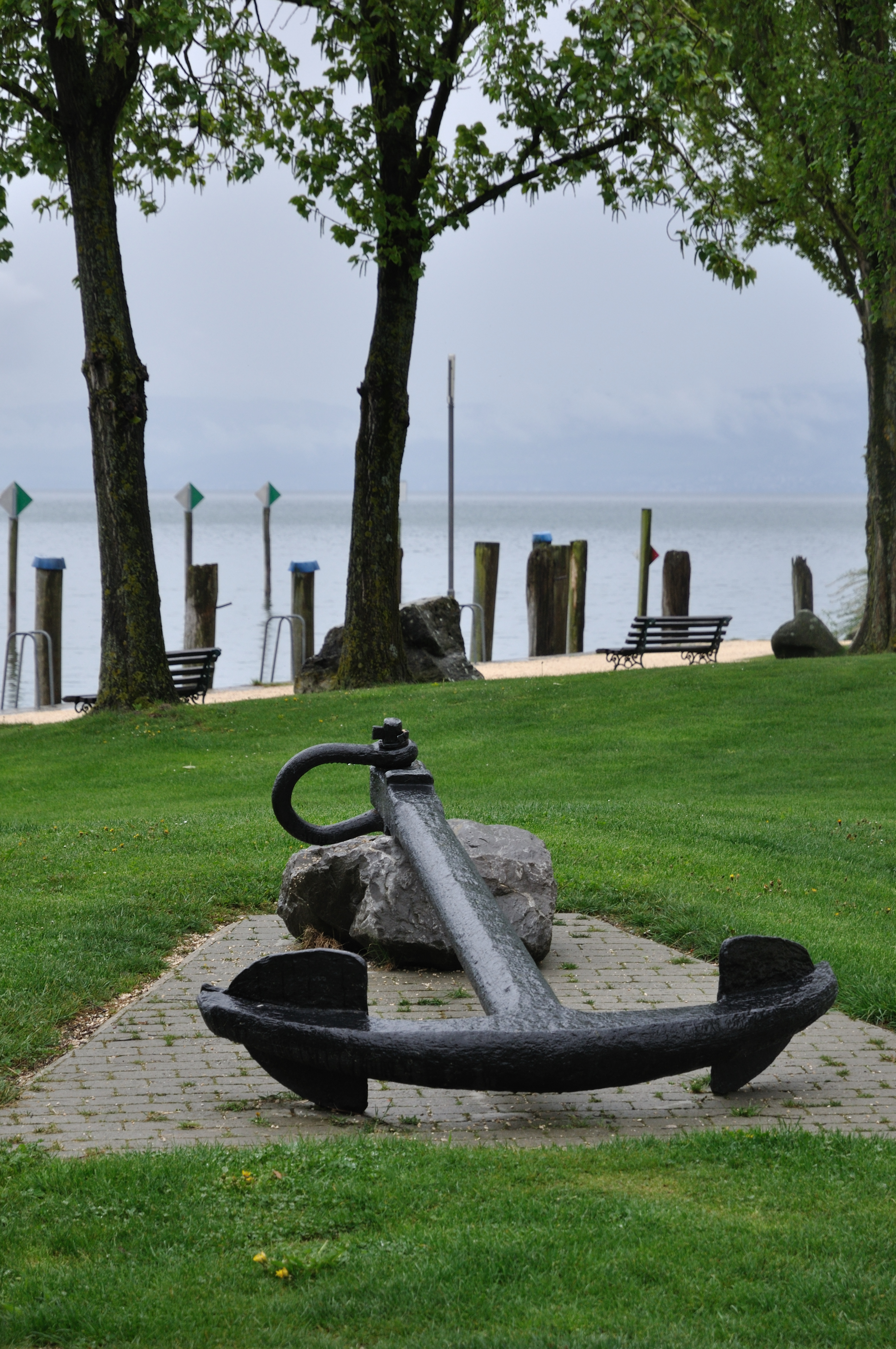
Shipping pier Immenstaad am Bodensee

The first documented reference to Immenstaad dates to the year 1094, when the Bavarian Duke Welf IV acquired the possessions of Weingarten Abbey. The controlling authorities were strongly factionalized until the Fürstenberg family bought the entire town in the late 18th century. In 1806 the town became a border town in the state of Baden-Württemberg.

Immenstaad am Bodensee was the home of the former Dornier aerospace company, which now is part of the Airbus. It is more famous as a popular resort and well known for its wine and fruit farming activities.
