= Patrick A. Baeuerle =

German molecular biologist

- Born: Patrick Alexander Baeuerle; November 24, 1957 (age 68); Friedrichshafen, West Germany
- Occupations: Molecular biologist, Immunologist, Entrepreneur and professor
- Years active: 1986-present

Patrick Baeuerle (born 24 November 1957) is a Germanmolecular biologist, immunologist, professor and a biopharmaceutical entrepreneur. Baeuerle is known for his work on tyrosine sulfation of proteins, transcription factor NF-kappaB, and the development of bispecific T-cell engaging antibodies for therapy of cancer.

== Education ==
Baeuerle earned his diploma in biology from the University of Konstanz, Germany. He received his Ph.D. in biochemistry summa cum laude, from LMU Munich. His postdoctoral training was with the Nobel Laureate David Baltimore at the Whitehead Institute at Massachusetts Institute of Technology, Cambridge, MA.

== Career ==
After his post-doctorate, Baeuerle led a research group at Gene Center in Martinsried, Germany. In 1993, he became the professor of molecular biology, and was and the chairman at the medical faculty of the University of Freiburg, Germany.

Between 1996 and 2015, he served as head of drug discovery at Tularik Inc., as chief scientific officer at Micromet Inc., and as a vice president research for Amgen Inc. in Munich, Germany.

Baeuerle is the co-founder of the companies, iOmx AG, Harpoon Inc, TCR^{2} Inc, Maverick Inc, and Cullinan LLC. He is one of the Managing directors at MPM capital, which is a Cambridge-based venture capital firm.

== Research Activities ==
=== Tyrosine Sulfation ===
In 1987, Baeuerle showed that tyrosine sulfation is a frequent modification of secretory proteins that is added in the trans-Golgi compartment.

=== Transcription factor NF-kappaB ===
Baeuerle deciphered the canonical pathway by which transcription factor NF-kappaB is activated and first described inhibitory subunit I-kappaB and the p65/RelA subunit. Baeuerle is said to be one of the inventors of the controversial NF-kappaB. He along with his team showed that NF-kappaB is an oxidative stress-responsive transcription factor and described a functional role of NF-kappaB in the nervous system.

=== Cancer Therapy ===
Baeuerle lead the development of BiTE antibody Blincyto® (blinatumomab; AMG 103) which is approved by the US FDA for treatment of relapsed/refractory acute lymphoblastic leukemia. He has invented various antibody-based constructs that are designed to engage cytotoxic T cells for lysis of cancer cells.
