= Stefan Sommer =

German engineer (born 1963)

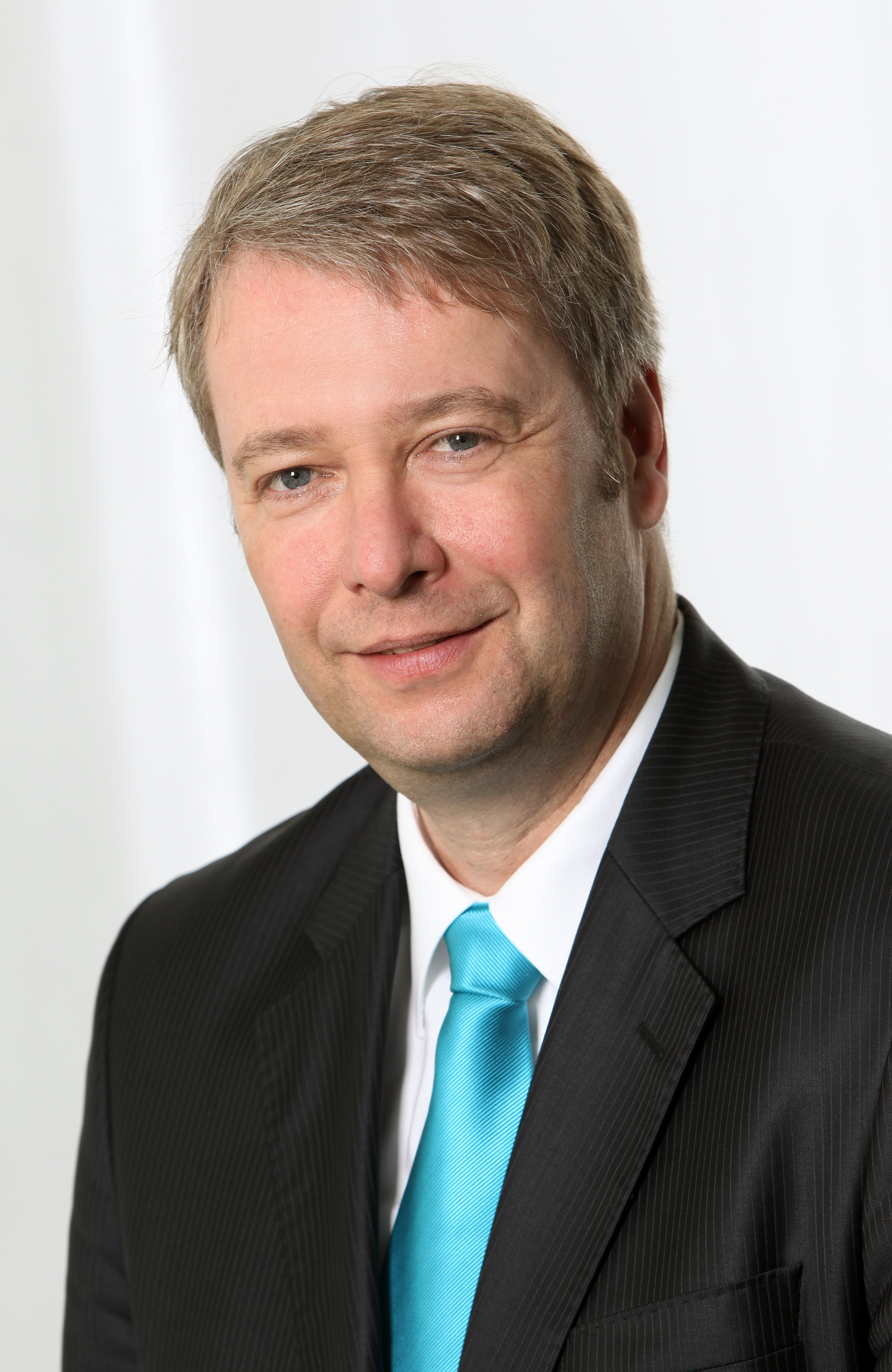
Dr. Stefan Sommer, CEO of the German Automotive Supplier ZF Friedrichshafen AG

Stefan Sommer (born January 7, 1963, in Münster, West Germany) is a German engineer who was the chief executive officer of ZF Friedrichshafen AG, also known as ZF Group, from 2012 until 2017.

== Early life and education ==
Sommer studied mechanical engineering at Ruhr University Bochum, specialising in automation. There he earned an engineering doctorate while holding a professorship in automatic control engineering.

== Career ==
Sommer began his professional career in 1994 as a development engineer at ITT Automotive Group Europe GmbH in Frankfurt am Main. In 1997, he moved to Continental Automotive Systems in Hanover, beginning as director of electronics & sensor development. After occupying several positions at Continental, the last of which being senior vice-president of EBS Customer Center, Sommer moved to what was then named ZF Sachs AG in Schweinfurt in 2008, whereupon he joined its board of directors in charge of chassis operations.

In the summer of 2010, the supervisory board of ZF Sach’s parent company, ZF Friedrichshafen AG, appointed Sommer to its executive board in Friedrichshafen, where he assumed responsibility for materials management.

From 1 January 2012, Sommer also served as deputy chief executive officer of ZF Group, before becoming Hans-Georg Härter’s successor as chief executive officer of ZF Friedrichshafen AG. On 7 December 2017 Sommer quit the CEO position of ZF.

Since 2019, Sommer has been a member of the board member of Volkswagen, with responsibility for procurement.

== Other activities ==
- Knorr-Bremse, Member of the Supervisory Board (since 2021)
