= Martin Paul (professor) =

German pharmacologist

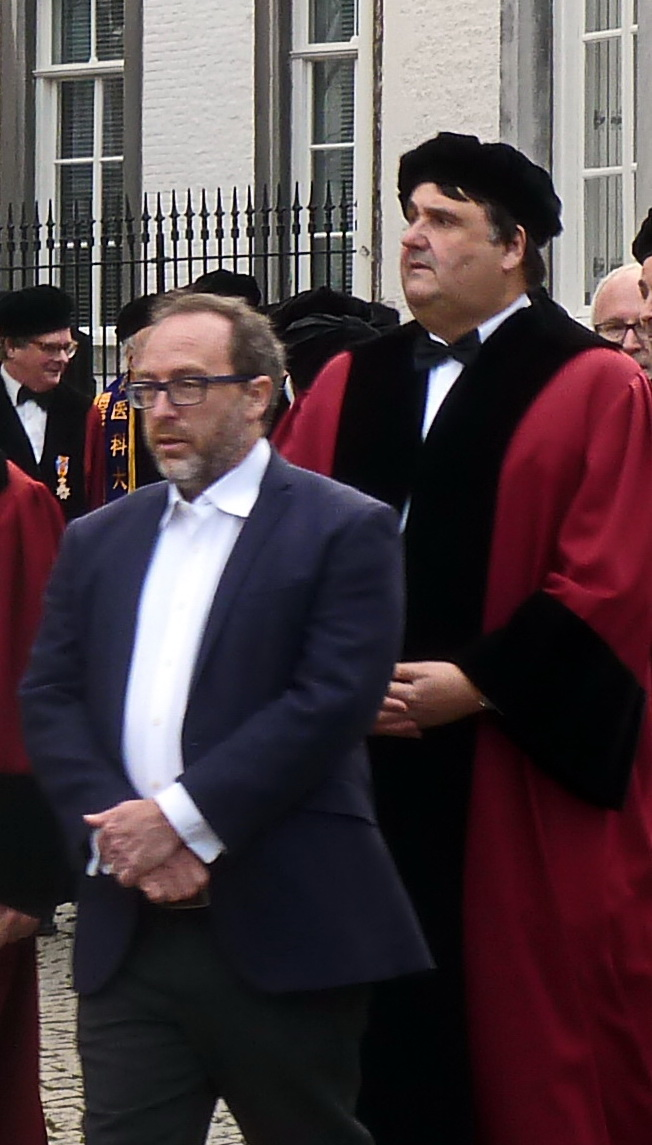
Jimmy Wales and Martin Paul in 2015

Martin Alfons Paul (born 1958 in Sankt Ingbert, Saarland) is a German clinical pharmacologist. On 1 May 2011 he succeeded Jo Ritzen as president of Maastricht University. On 29 April 2021 it was announced that he will succeed Axel Schölmerich as rector of the Ruhr University Bochum in Germany on 1 November 2021.

After stints as a lecturer at Heidelberg University and as a research group leader with Detlev Ganten at Max Delbrück Center for Molecular Medicine in Berlin-Buch, Paul became Full Professor of Clinical Pharmacology at the Benjamin Franklin Medical Center of the Freie Universität (FU) Berlin in 1995. At the FU, Paul was director of the Institute of Clinical Pharmacology and Toxicology from 1997 to 2008 and dean of the Medical Faculty from 1997 to 2003. He was also dean of the Medical Faculty and vice president of the Board of Directors of Charité Medical Center, the joint university hospital resulting from the merger of the medical schools of the FU and Humboldt University of Berlin, from 2004 to 2008. He subsequently relocated to the Netherlands, where he was dean of the Maastricht University Faculty of Health, Medicine and Life Sciences and vice chair of the Maastricht University Medical Centre from 2008 to 2011.

== Other activities ==
Martin Paul has served on the boards of various professional organisations. He was president of German Society of Experimental and Clinical Pharmacology and Toxicology from 2006 to 2007 and chairman of the European Council for Cardiovascular Research from 2006 to 2008.

In addition, Paul has worked to improve academic management at the European level. He chaired the European network of deans and academic managers (DEAN) and was a board member of the European Centre for Strategic Management of Universities (ESMU) from 2003 to 2006. He has been a member of the Netherlands Academy of Technology and Innovation (AcTI) since 2012.

As of January 2018, Paul is chairman of the Worldwide Universities Network (WUN).

== Publications ==
Martin Paul has authored more than 200 research papers in the fields of molecular medicine, clinical and experimental pharmacology and cardiovascular disease. He has been active in several professional organizations, for example as president of German Society of Experimental and Clinical Pharmacology and Toxicology (DGPT) and as Chairman of the European Council for Cardiovascular Research (ECCR).
