= Oil engine =

Oil engine may refer to:

- Hornsby-Akroyd oil engine, the first internal combustion engine using heavy oil as fuel
- Crude oil engine, an internal combustion engine which can use many kinds of oil as fuel
- Oil burner (engine), a steam engine that uses oil as its fuel
- Hot bulb engine
- Hesselman engine
- Some forms of internal combustion engine, so called during an early period in their development

== See also ==
- Diesel engine
