= St Vincents Hall =

Gothic Revival mansion in Grantham, Lincolnshire, England

Coordinates: 52.9051°N 0.6265°W

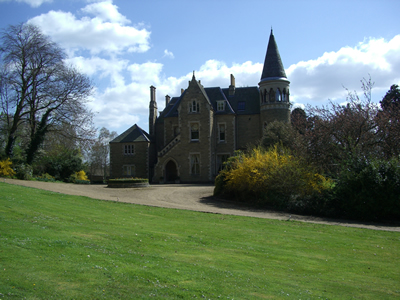
Front entrance of St Vincents Hall

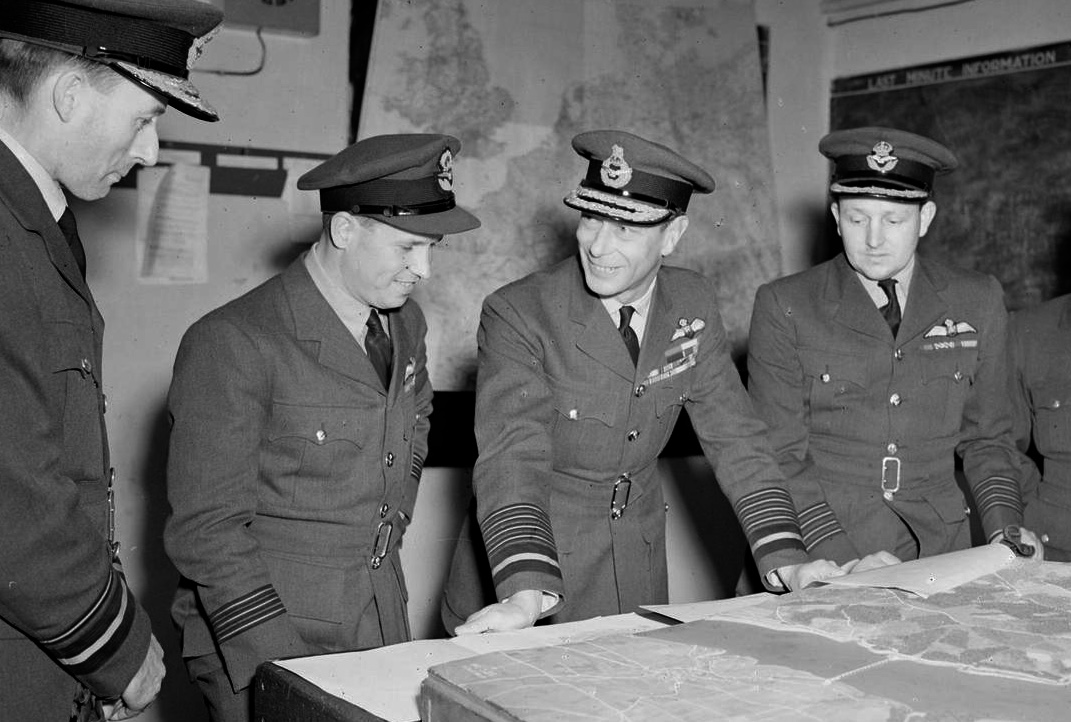
Cochrane, Gibson, King George VI and Whitworth discussing the Dambusters Raid.

St Vincents Hall is a Gothic Revival mansion in Grantham, Lincolnshire, England. It is a Grade II listed building.

== History ==
The house was designed in the Gothic Revival style and built for the industrialist Richard Hornsby, who founded Richard Hornsby & Sons, an engine and machinery manufacturer, in 1868. The Hornsby family sold the property to the Paravicini family before the building was sold to the Air Ministry. The 1920s witnessed many visitors including Tsar Nicholas of Russia's brother fleeing the Bolsheviks.

St Vincents Hall is best known for being the Second World War HQ of 5 Group Bomber Command between October 1937 and November 1943 and was where Operation Chastise of May 1943 – immortalized in The Dam Busters film – was planned. On the night of 16/17 May 1943 Air Marshall Arthur Harris, Barnes Wallis and other RAF high command were in St Vincents Hall when coded radio messages were received confirming that the raid had breached the Möhne and Eder dams. Air Marshall Harris is reputed to have said to Barnes Wallis: "Wallis, I didn't believe a word you said about this damn bomb, but you could sell me a pink elephant now".

In December 1943 the building became headquarters for the USAAF's Ninth Air Force's IX Troop Carrier Command. After the war the house was retained by the Air Ministry and in 1960 became the headquarters of the Air Ministry Works Directorate No 1 Area, housing civil, mechanical and electrical engineers and surveyors. In 1962, the property agencies of the Air Ministry, Admiralty and War Office were amalgamated into the Ministry of Public Building and Works. Two years later, the Ministry was reorganised and St Vincents became surplus to requirements. It was eventually purchased by South Kesteven District Council and became home to the local planning authority. St Vincents is now privately owned.

== Architecture ==
The house is made of rock-faced limestone with ashlar dressings and steeply pitched Welsh slate roofs, with decorative ridge tiles. Ashlar coped gables with moulded kneelers and finials. North front entrance has central projecting gabled wing, with single storey, lean to, porch to the left. The doorway has a pointed arched moulded ashlar surround, with marble shafts, and hood mould. Above is a moulded ashlar parapet pierced with quatrefoils. To the right a 2-light chamfered window, with tracery, above a single plain sash, in a flat headed chamfered surround, with a pointed inner arch. Above again a 3-light, chamfered mullion window, with a taller central light with cusped heads. At the north-west corner a circular or 'candle wick' tower, of 3 storeys, the lower 2 storeys have 3 single light chamfered lancets, with quatrefoil tracery.

== Memorials ==
The house has two memorials to 5 Group Bomber Command and 617 Squadron and houses a collection of RAF Bomber Command items.
