= Vaporizing oil engine =

Vaporizing oil engine may refer to:

- spark ignition engine running on Tractor vaporising oil
- hot bulb engine
- Hornsby-Akroyd oil engine
