= Drott =

Drott may refer to:

- Drott Manufacturing Company
- Drott, a trademark of the Swedish company Pythagoras
- HK Drott, handball club, based in Halmstad, Sweden
- Dick Drott, American baseball player

== See also ==
- Drot (disambiguation)
