= Drot =

Drot may refer to:

- Jean-Marie Drot, French writer and documentary maker
- Drot, pseudonym of Oleksander Tysovsky, founder of the Ukrainian Scouting organization Plast

== See also ==
- Drott (disambiguation)
