= Herbert Akroyd Stuart =

English engine design pioneer (1864–1927)

Herbert Akroyd Stuart (1864–1927) – Inventor of the hot bulb heavy oil engine

Herbert Akroyd-Stuart (28 January 1864 – 19 February 1927) was an English inventor who is noted for his invention of the hot bulb engine, or heavy oil engine.

== Life ==
Akroyd-Stuart was born in Halifax, Yorkshire, but lived in Australia for a period in his early years. He was educated at Newbury Grammar School (now St. Bartholomew's School) and Finsbury Technical College in London. He was the son of Charles Stuart, founder of the Bletchley Iron and Tinplate Works, joining his father in the business in 1887.

== Oil engines ==
In 1885, Akroyd Stuart accidentally spilt paraffin oil (kerosene) into a pot of molten tin. The paraffin oil vaporised and caught fire when in contact with a paraffin lamp. This gave him an idea to pursue the possibility of using paraffin oil (very similar to modern-day diesel) for an engine, which unlike petrol proved difficult to vaporise in a carburettor because its volatility is insufficient.

His first prototype engines were built in 1886. In 1890, in collaboration with Charles Richard Binney, he filed Patent 7146 for Richard Hornsby and Sons of Grantham, Lincolnshire, England. The patent was entitled: Improvements in Engines Operated by the Explosion of Mixtures of Combustible Vapour or Gas and Air. One such engine was sold to Newport Sanitary Authority, but the compression ratio was too low to get it started from cold, and it needed a heat poultice to get it going.

=== Hornsby–Akroyd engine ===
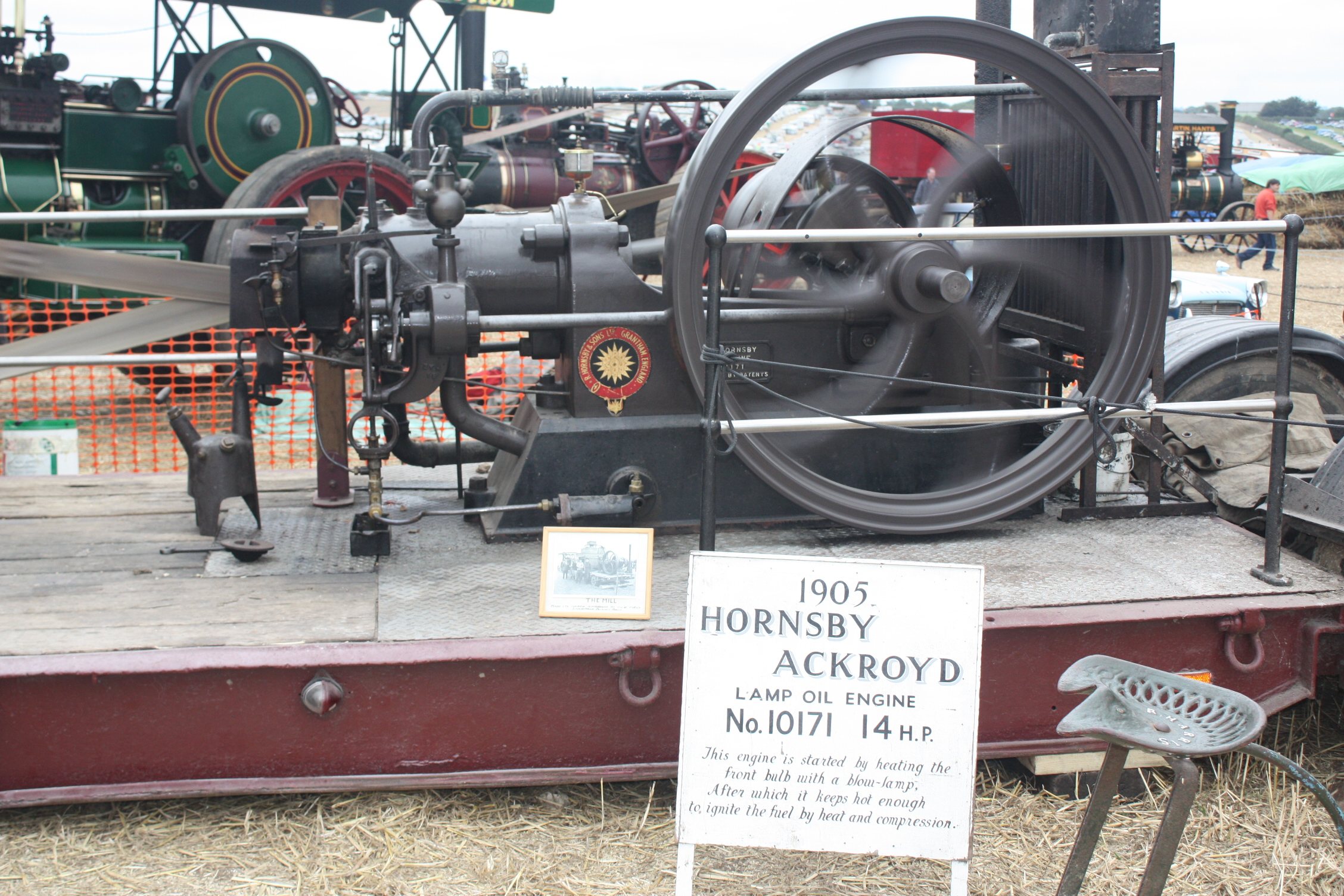
A Hornsby–Akroyd engine working at the Great Dorset Steam Fair

Akroyd-Stuart's engines were built from 26 June 1891 by Richard Hornsby and Sons as the Hornsby Akroyd Patent Oil Engine under licence and were first sold commercially on 8 July 1892. It was the first internal combustion engine to use a pressurised fuel injection system.

The Hornsby–Akroyd engine used a comparatively low compression ratio, so that the temperature of the air compressed in the combustion chamber at the end of the compression stroke was not high enough to initiate combustion. Combustion instead took place in a separated combustion chamber, the vaporizer (also called the hot bulb) mounted on the cylinder head, into which fuel was sprayed. It was connected to the cylinder by a narrow passage and was heated either by the cylinder's coolant or by exhaust gases while running; an external flame such as a blowtorch was used for starting. Self-ignition occurred from contact between the fuel-air mixture and the hot walls of the vaporizer. By contracting the bulb to a very narrow neck where it attached to the cylinder, a high degree of turbulence was set up as the ignited gases flashed through the neck into the cylinder, where combustion was completed. As the engine's load increased, so did the temperature of the bulb, causing the ignition period to advance; to counteract pre-ignition, water was dripped into the air intake.

Hot bulb engines were produced until the late 1920s, often being called semi-diesels, even though they were not as efficient as compression ignition engines. They had the advantage of comparative simplicity, since they did not require the air compressor used by early Diesel engines; fuel was injected mechanically (solid injection) near the start of the compression stroke, at a much lower pressure than that of Diesel engines.

=== Oil-engined locomotive ===
Richard Hornsby and Sons built the world's first oil-engined railway locomotive LACHESIS for the Royal Arsenal, Woolwich, England, in 1896. They also built the first compression-ignition powered automobile.

=== Oil engines outside the UK ===
Sweden

Similar engines were built by Bolinder in Sweden and some of these still survive in canal boats.

United States

Hot bulb engines were built in the USA by the De La Vergne Company of New York City, later the New York Refrigerating Company – inventing the modern refrigerator in 1930, who purchased a licence in 1893.

=== Akroyd engine and Diesel engine ===
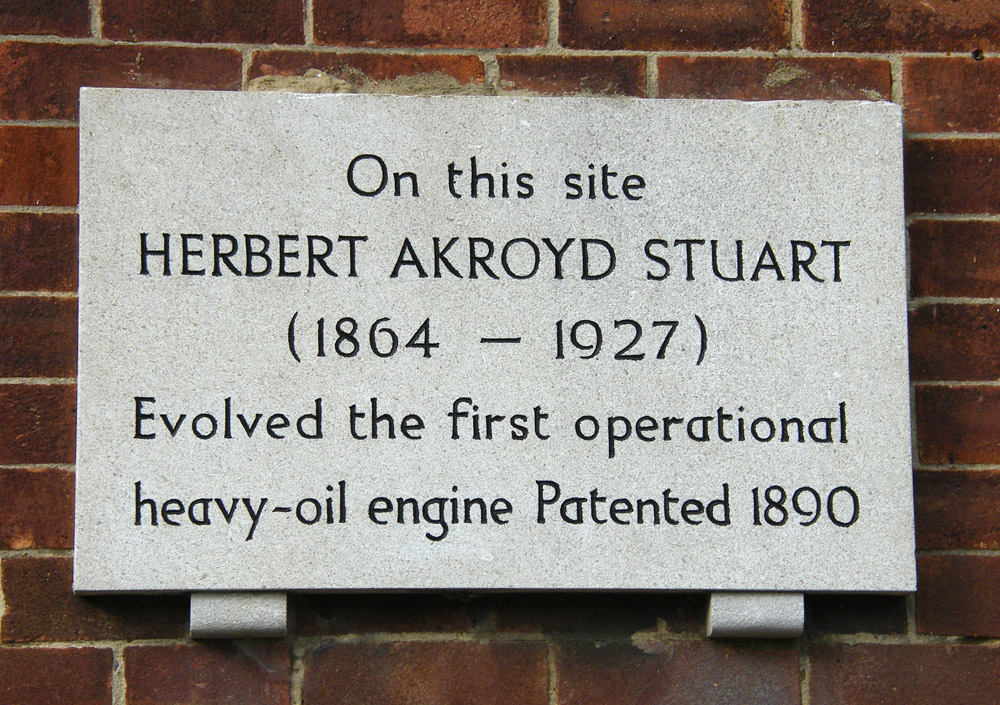
Plaque in Denmark Street, Fenny Stratford, UK, commemorating the work of Herbert Akroyd Stuart

Both the Diesel engine and the Akroyd engine run the same kind of fuel, petroleum oil, which has led to a dispute about whether or not the Diesel engine is based upon the Akroyd engine. The fact that the Diesel engine's operating principle differs from the operating principle Rudolf Diesel describes in his essay Theory and Construction of a Rational Heat Motor further contributed to this. The Akroyd engine was the first functional internal combustion engine that could use petroleum oil as fuel. It was operational in 1891, six years before the Diesel engine first ran. However, after the Diesel engine had proven successful, Diesel engine became the synonym for an engine that ran on any sort of petroleum oil. Oil engines that used the Akroyd operating principle were called semi-Diesel, and the name Akroyd, which had been associated with oil engines, fell out of use. Therefore, Herbert Akroyd Stuart sought to replace the term Diesel engine with Akroyd engine in the early 20th century.

Herbert Akroyd Stuart had two patents, No. 7146 Improvements in Engines Operated by the Explosion of Mixtures of Combustible Vapour or Gas and Air, and No. 15994. In the former, the Akroyd engine's operating principle is described as follows: "... at the desired part of this compression stroke, the supply of liquid hydrocarbon is forced, in a spray form, on to the heated vaporiser, which almost instantly changes it into a gas...". Early Akroyd engines indeed operated on this principle. Rudolf Diesel had a patent on the combustion process described in his essay (DRP 67207). The Diesel engine neither operates on the process described in the Akroyd patent, nor on the process described in the DRP 67207 patent. It operates instead on a different operating principle, also invented by Rudolf Diesel (patented in 1893, DRP 82168), which is why Diesel is in fact the Diesel engine's inventor. However, Diesel never admitted that his engine operated on a secret operating principle, and claimed that the Diesel engine operates on the (impossible) operating process described in the DRP 67207 patent.

The key difference between the Akroyd and Diesel engines is the ignition: In an Akroyd engine, an ignition device – the hot bulb, or vaporiser – ignites the fuel, because the compression is too low for compression ignition (<300 kPa). A Diesel engine on the other hand has no discrete ignition devices. The fuel instead ignites due to high heat caused solely by piston compression inside the cylinder (>3000 kPa). Since higher compression leads to better efficiency, the lower-pressure Akroyd engine consumes ~ 80% more fuel than a Diesel engine doing the same work.

== Death ==
In 1900, he moved to Australia and set up a company Sanders & Stuart with his brother Charles. He died on 19 February 1927 in Perth, Australia of throat cancer. His body was transported back to England and was buried in All Souls Cemetery in Boothtown, Halifax, Yorkshire. All Souls Church was built at the sole expense of his maternal uncle, Edward Akroyd.

The University of Nottingham has hosted the Akroyd-Stuart Memorial Lecture on occasional years in his memory since 1928. One was presented by Sir Frank Whittle in 1946. Akroyd Stuart had worked with Professor William Robinson in the late 19th century, who was professor of engineering from 1890 to 1924 at University College Nottingham.

Akroyd-Stuart also left money to the Institution of Mechanical Engineers, Royal Aeronautical Society and Institute of Marine Engineering, which provided for their respective bi-annual Akroyd-Stuart Prizes.

== See also ==
- History of the internal combustion engine
