= Crude oil engine =

Type of internal combustion engine

The crude oil engine is a type of internal combustion engine similar to the hot bulb engine. A crude oil engine could be driven by all sorts of oils such as engine waste oil and vegetable oils. Like hot bulb engines, crude oil engines were mostly used as stationary engines or in boats/ships. They can run for a very long time; for instance, at the world fair in Milan in 1906, a FRAM engine was started and ran until over one year later. A crude oil engine is a low RPM engine dimensioned for constant running and can last for a very long time if maintained properly.

== Modern crude oil engines ==
Large industrial diesel engines are capable of running on unrefined crude oil, and are widely used in the oil and gas industry. Additionally, large medium-speed and low-speed marine engines used on ships can also run on crude oil, although significant filtering and processing is often needed before it can be pumped into the engine.
