= Hot-bulb engine =

Internal combustion engine

Hot-bulb engine (two-stroke). 1. Hot bulb. 2. Cylinder. 3. Piston. 4. Crankcase

Old Swedish hot-bulb engine in action

The hot-bulb engine, also known as a semi-diesel or Akroyd engine, is a type of internal combustion engine in which fuel ignites by coming in contact with a red-hot metal surface inside a bulb, followed by the introduction of air (oxygen) compressed into the hot-bulb chamber by the rising piston. There is some ignition when the fuel is introduced, but it quickly uses up the available oxygen in the bulb. Vigorous ignition takes place only when sufficient oxygen is supplied to the hot-bulb chamber on the compression stroke of the engine.

Most hot-bulb engines were produced as one or two-cylinder, low-speed two-stroke, crankcase-scavenged units.

== History ==
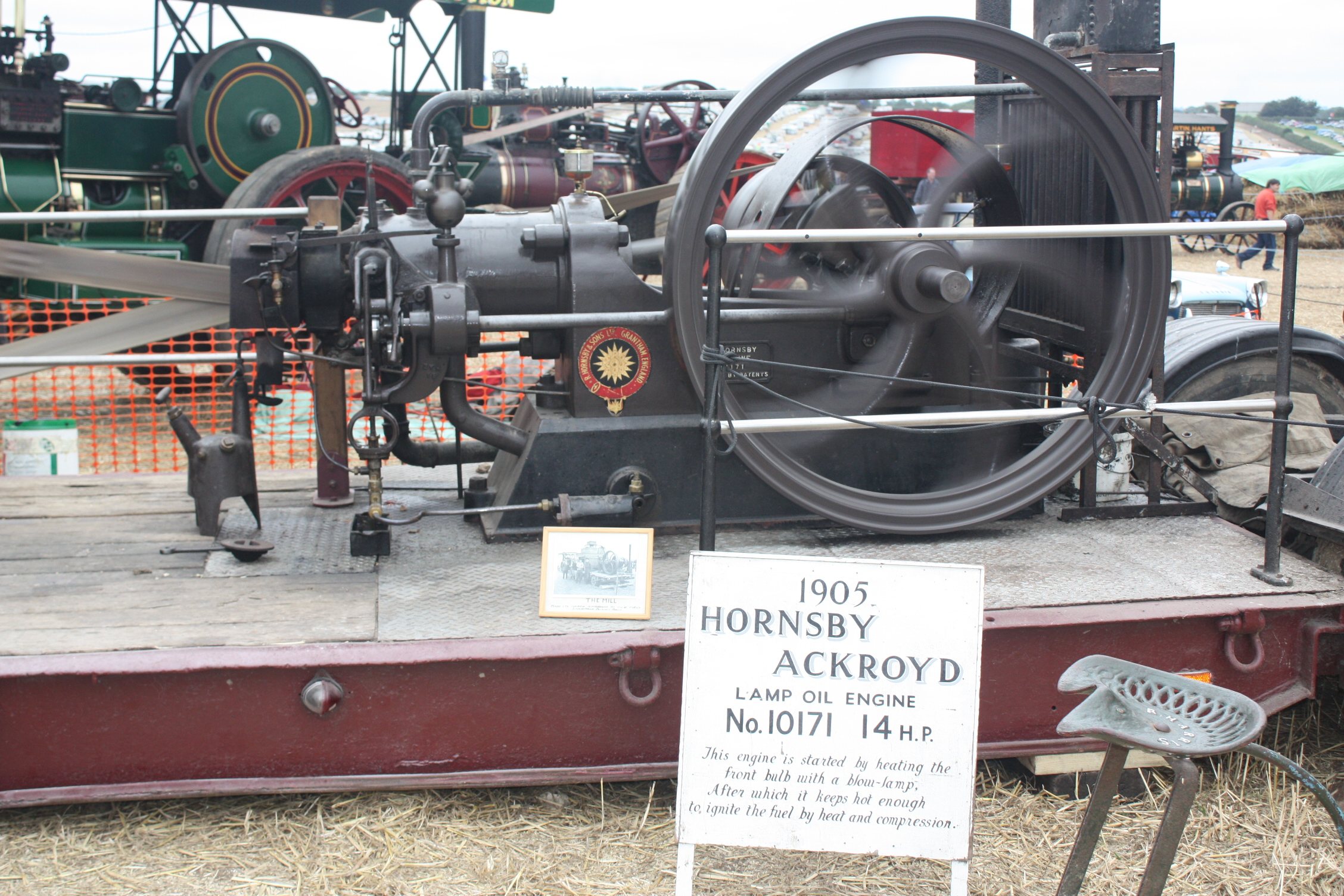
Hornsby–Akroyd oil engine (1905): Four-stroke, 14 HP running at the Great Dorset Steam Fair in 2008

=== Four-stroke Hornsby–Akroyd oil engine ===
The concept of this engine was established by Herbert Akroyd Stuart, an English inventor. The first prototypes were built in 1886 and production started in 1891 by Richard Hornsby & Sons of Grantham, Lincolnshire, England under the title Hornsby Akroyd Patent Oil Engine under licence.

=== Two-stroke hot-bulb engines ===
Some years later, Akroyd-Stuart's design was further developed in the United States by the German emigrants Mietz and Weiss, who combined the hot-bulb engine with the two-stroke scavenging principle, developed by Joseph Day to provide nearly twice the power, as compared to a four-stroke engine of the same size. Similar engines, for agricultural and marine use, were built by J. V. Svensons Motorfabrik, Bolinders, Lysekils Mekaniska Verkstad, AB Pythagoras and many other factories in Sweden.

=== Comparison to a diesel engine ===
Akroyd-Stuart's engine was the first internal combustion engine to use a pressurised fuel injection system and also the first using a separate vapourising combustion chamber. It is the forerunner of all hot-bulb engines, which is considered the predecessor to diesel engines with antechamber injection.

The Hornsby–Akroyd oil engine and other hot-bulb engines are different from Rudolf Diesel's design where ignition occurs through the heat of compression alone. An Akroyd engine will have a compression ratio between 3:1 and 5:1 whereas a typical diesel engine will have a much higher compression ratio, usually between 15:1 and 20:1 making it more efficient. In an Akroyd engine the fuel is injected during the early intake stroke (at 140° BTDC) and not at the peak of compression (at 15° BTDC) as in a diesel engine.

== Operation and working cycle ==
The hot-bulb engine shares its basic layout with nearly all other internal combustion engines in that it has a piston inside a cylinder connected to a flywheel by a connecting rod and crankshaft. Akroyd-Stuart's original engine operated on the four-stroke cycle (induction, compression, power and exhaust), and Hornsby continued to build engines to this design, as did several other British manufacturers such as Blackstone and Crossley. Manufacturers in Europe, Scandinavia and in the United States (and some British firms including Petter, Gardner and Allen) built engines working on the two-stroke cycle with crankcase scavenging. The latter type formed the majority of hot-bulb engine production. The flow of gases through the engine is controlled by valves in four-stroke engines, and by the piston covering and uncovering ports in the cylinder wall in two-strokes.

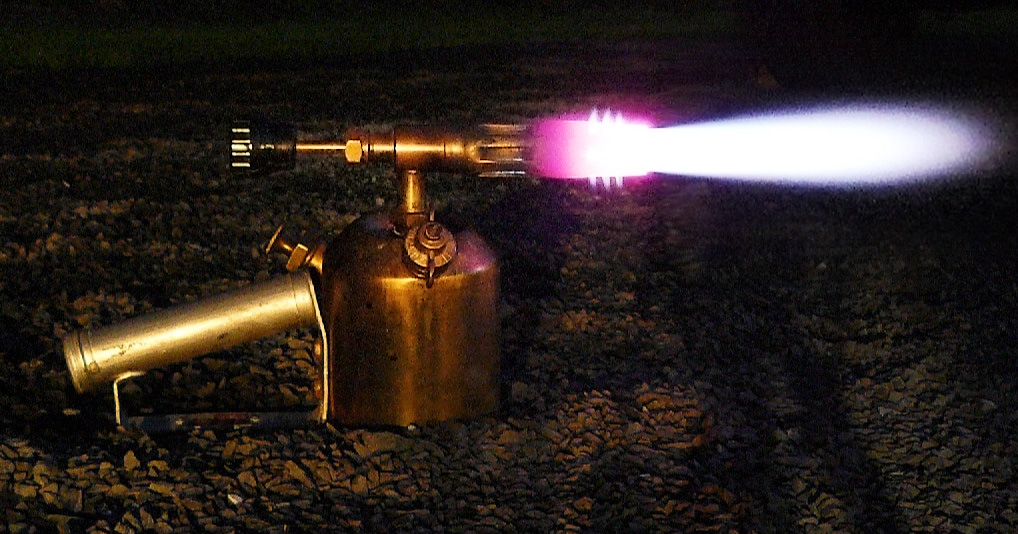
Blow torch used to start a hot-bulb engine

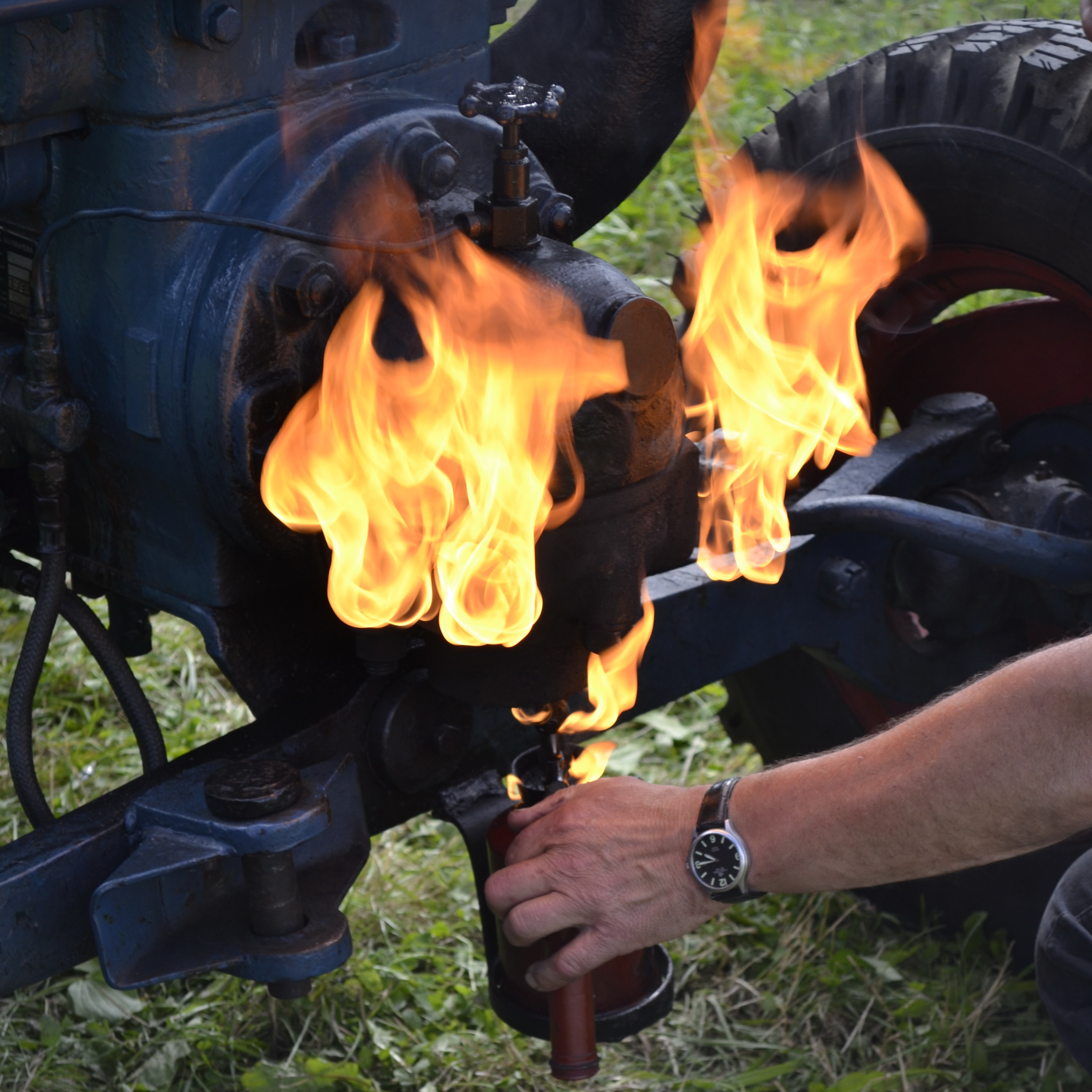
Blow-lamp being used to heat the hot bulb of a Lanz Bulldog tractor

In the hot-bulb engine combustion takes place in a separated combustion chamber called the vaporizer (also called the hot bulb) usually mounted on the cylinder head, into which fuel is sprayed. It is connected to the cylinder by a narrow passage and is heated by combustion gases while running; an external flame, such as a blow torch or slow-burning wick, is used for starting; on later models, electric heating or pyrotechnics were sometimes used. Another method was the inclusion of a spark plug and vibrator-coil ignition; the engine would be started on petrol (gasoline) and switched over to oil after warming to running temperature.

The pre-heating time depends on the engine design, the type of heating used and the ambient temperature, but for most engines in a temperate climate generally ranges from 2 to 5 minutes to as much as half an hour if operating in extreme cold or the engine is especially large. The engine is then turned over, usually by hand, but sometimes by compressed air or an electric motor.

Once the engine is running, the heat of compression and ignition maintains the hot bulb at the necessary temperature, and the blow-lamp or other heat source can be removed. Thereafter, the engine requires no external heat and requires only a supply of air, fuel oil and lubricating oil to run. However, under low power the bulb could cool off too much. If the load on the engine is low, combustion temperatures may not be sufficient to maintain the temperature of the hot bulb. Many hot-bulb engines cannot be run off-load without auxiliary heating for this reason. Some engines had a throttle valve in their air intakes to cut down the supply of excess cold air for when running at light load or low speed, and others had adjustable fuel sprayer nozzles that could be adjusted to deliver a strong jet of fuel oil into the core of the hot bulb where temperatures would be greatest, rather than the normal wide spray of atomised fuel, to maintain self-combustion under prolonged low load running or idling. Equally, as the engine's load increases, so does the temperature of the bulb. This causes the start of combustion to advance (occurring earlier in the cycle) which reduces power and efficiency. If combustion is allowed to advance too much then damaging pre-ignition can occur. This was a limiting factor on the power output of hot-bulb engines and in order to circumvent this limit some hot-bulb engines feature a system whereby water is dripped into the air intake to reduce the temperature of the air charge and counteract pre-ignition, thus allowing higher power outputs.

The fact that the engine can be left unattended for long periods while running made hot-bulb engines a popular choice for applications requiring a steady power output, such as farm tractors, generators, pumps and canal boat propulsion.

=== Four-stroke engines ===
Air is drawn into the cylinder through the intake valve as the piston descends (the induction stroke). During the same stroke, fuel is sprayed into the vaporizer by a mechanical (jerk-type) fuel pump through a nozzle. The injected fuel vapourises on contact with the hot interior of the vaporizer but the heat is not sufficient to cause ignition. The air in the cylinder is then forced through the opening into the vaporizer as the piston rises (the compression stroke), where it is lightly compressed (a ratio of around 3:1) – this is not sufficient to cause significant temperature rise of the air charge, which is mostly caused by the air being heated by contact with the internal surfaces of the hot bulb (red hot due to external heating applied before starting or due to the maintained heat of combustion as the engine runs). The compression stroke mostly serves to create a turbulent movement of air from the cylinder into the vaporizer, which mixes with the pre-vaporized fuel oil. This mixing, and the increase in oxygen content as the air is lightly compressed into the vaporizer, causes the fuel oil vapour to spontaneously ignite. The combustion of the fuel charge is completed in the hot bulb, but creates an expanding charge of exhaust gases and superheated air. The resulting pressure drives the piston down (the power stroke). The piston's action is converted to a rotary motion by the crankshaft–flywheel assembly, to which equipment can be attached for work to be performed. The flywheel stores momentum, some of which is used to turn the engine when power is not being produced. The piston rises, expelling exhaust gases through the exhaust valve (the exhaust stroke). The cycle then starts again.

=== Two-stroke engines ===
The basic action of fuel injection and combustion is common to all hot-bulb engines, whether four- or two-stroke. The cycle starts with the piston at the bottom of its stroke. As it rises, it draws air into the crankcase through the inlet port. At the same time fuel is sprayed into the vaporiser. The charge of air on top of the piston is driven into the vaporiser, where it mixes with the atomised fuel and combustion takes place. The piston is driven down the cylinder. As it descends, the piston first uncovers the exhaust port. The pressurised exhaust gases flow out of the cylinder. A fraction after the exhaust port is uncovered, the descending piston uncovers the transfer port. The piston is now pressurising the air in the crankcase, which is forced through the transfer port and into the space above the piston. Part of the incoming air charge is lost out of the still-open exhaust port to ensure all the exhaust gases are cleared from the cylinder, a process known as scavenging. The piston then reaches the bottom of its stroke and begins to rise again, drawing a fresh charge of air into the crankcase and completing the cycle. Induction and compression are carried out on the upward stroke, while power and exhaust occur on the downward stroke.

A supply of lubricating oil must be fed to the crankcase to supply the crankshaft bearings. Since the crankcase is also used to supply air to the engine, the engine's lubricating oil is carried into the cylinder with the air charge, burnt during combustion and carried out of the exhaust. The oil carried from the crankcase to the cylinder is used to lubricate the piston. This means that a two-stroke hot-bulb engine will gradually burn its supply of lubricating oil, a design known as a total-loss lubricating system. There were also designs that employed a scavenge pump or similar to remove oil from the crankcase and return it to the lubricating-oil reservoir. Lanz hot-bulb tractors and their many imitators had this feature, which reduced oil consumption considerably.

In addition, if excess crankcase oil is present on start up, there is a danger of the engine starting and accelerating uncontrollably to well past the speed limits of the rotating and reciprocating components. This can result in destruction of the engine. There is normally a bung or stopcock that allows draining of the crankcase before starting.

The lack of valves and the doubled-up working cycle also means that a two-stroke hot-bulb engine can run equally well in both directions. A common starting technique for smaller two-stroke engines is to turn the engine over against the normal direction of rotation. The piston will bounce off the compression phase with sufficient force to spin the engine the correct way and start it. This bi-directional running was an advantage in marine applications, as the engine could, like the steam engine, drive a vessel forward or in reverse without the need for a gearbox. The direction could be reversed either by stopping the engine and starting it again in the other direction, or, with sufficient skill and timing on the part of the operator, slowing the engine until it carried just enough momentum to bounce against its own compression and run the other way. Because fuel injection takes place before compression and because combustion is not directly linked to a specific point in the engine's rotation (as with injection/combustion in a diesel engine or ignition/combustion in a spark-ignition engine), it is also possible to set the fueling on a two-stroke hot-bulb engine so that combustion occurs just before the piston reaches top dead centre, causing the engine to reverse direction of rotation until the piston next approaches TDC, when combustion takes place and rotation reverses again – the engine can run indefinitely in this way without ever completing a full rotation of the crankshaft. The hot-bulb engine is unique amongst internal combustion engines in being able to run at 'zero revolutions per minute'. This was also an attractive characteristic of the engine for marine use, since it could be left 'running' without generating meaningful thrust, avoiding the need to shut the engine down and later carry out the lengthy starting procedure.

The bi-directional abilities of the engine were an undesirable quality in hot-bulb-powered tractors equipped with gearboxes. At very low engine speeds the engine could reverse itself almost without any change in sound or running quality and without the driver noticing until the tractor drove in the opposite direction to that intended. Lanz Bulldog tractors featured a dial, mechanically driven by the engine, that showed a spinning arrow. The arrow pointed in the direction of normal engine rotation; if the dial spun the other way, the engine had reversed itself.

== Advantages ==
At the time the hot-bulb engine was invented, its great attractions were its efficiency, simplicity, and ease of operation in comparison to the steam engine, which was then the dominant source of power in industry. Condenserless steam engines achieved an average thermal efficiency (the fraction of generated heat that is actually turned into useful work) of around 6%. Hot-bulb engines could easily achieve 12% thermal efficiency.

From the 1910s to the 1950s, hot-bulb engines were more economical to manufacture with their low-pressure crude-fuel injection and had a lower compression ratio than Diesel's compression-ignition engines.

The hot-bulb engine is much simpler to construct and operate than the steam engine. Boilers require at least one person to add water and fuel as needed and to monitor pressure to prevent overpressure and a resulting explosion. If fitted with automatic lubrication systems and a governor to control engine speed, a hot-bulb engine could be left running unattended for hours at a time.

Another attraction was their safety. A steam engine, with its exposed fire and hot boiler, steam pipes and working cylinder could not be used in flammable conditions, such as munitions factories or fuel refineries. Hot-bulb engines also produced cleaner exhaust fumes. A big danger with the steam engine was that if the boiler pressure grew too high and the safety valve failed, a highly dangerous explosion could occur, although this was a relatively rare occurrence by the time the hot-bulb engine was invented. A more common problem was that if the water level in the boiler of a steam engine dropped too low, the lead plug in the crown of the furnace would melt, extinguishing the fire. If a hot-bulb engine ran out of fuel, it would simply stop and could be immediately restarted with more fuel. The water cooling was usually closed-circuit, so no water loss would occur unless there was a leak. If the cooling water ran low, the engine would seize through overheating — a major problem, but it carried no danger of explosion. Some engines, including those used in Lanz Bulldog tractors, had a fusible plug fitted in the hot bulb. If the engine overheated the plug would melt, preventing compression and combustion and stopping the engine before major damage could occur – a particularly desirable feature on engines that were to run unattended.

Compared with steam, petrol (Otto-cycle), and compression-ignition (Diesel-cycle) engines, hot-bulb engines are simpler, and therefore have fewer potential problems. There is no electrical system as found on a petrol engine, and no external boiler and steam system as on a steam engine.

The hot-bulb engine can run on a wide range of fuels, which is due to how combustion is achieved. Unlike engines operating on the Otto or Diesel principle, hot-bulb engines rely on fuel vapourisation and hot-bulb ignition rather than compression ignition. This means that, even poorly combustible fuels can be used in the hot-bulb engine.

Due to the lengthy pre-heating time, hot-bulb engines usually started easily, even in extremely cold conditions. This made them popular choices in cold regions, such as Canada and Scandinavia, where steam engines were not viable and early petrol and diesel engines could not be relied upon to operate. However, it also makes them unsuitable for short time running use, especially in an automobile.

== Uses ==
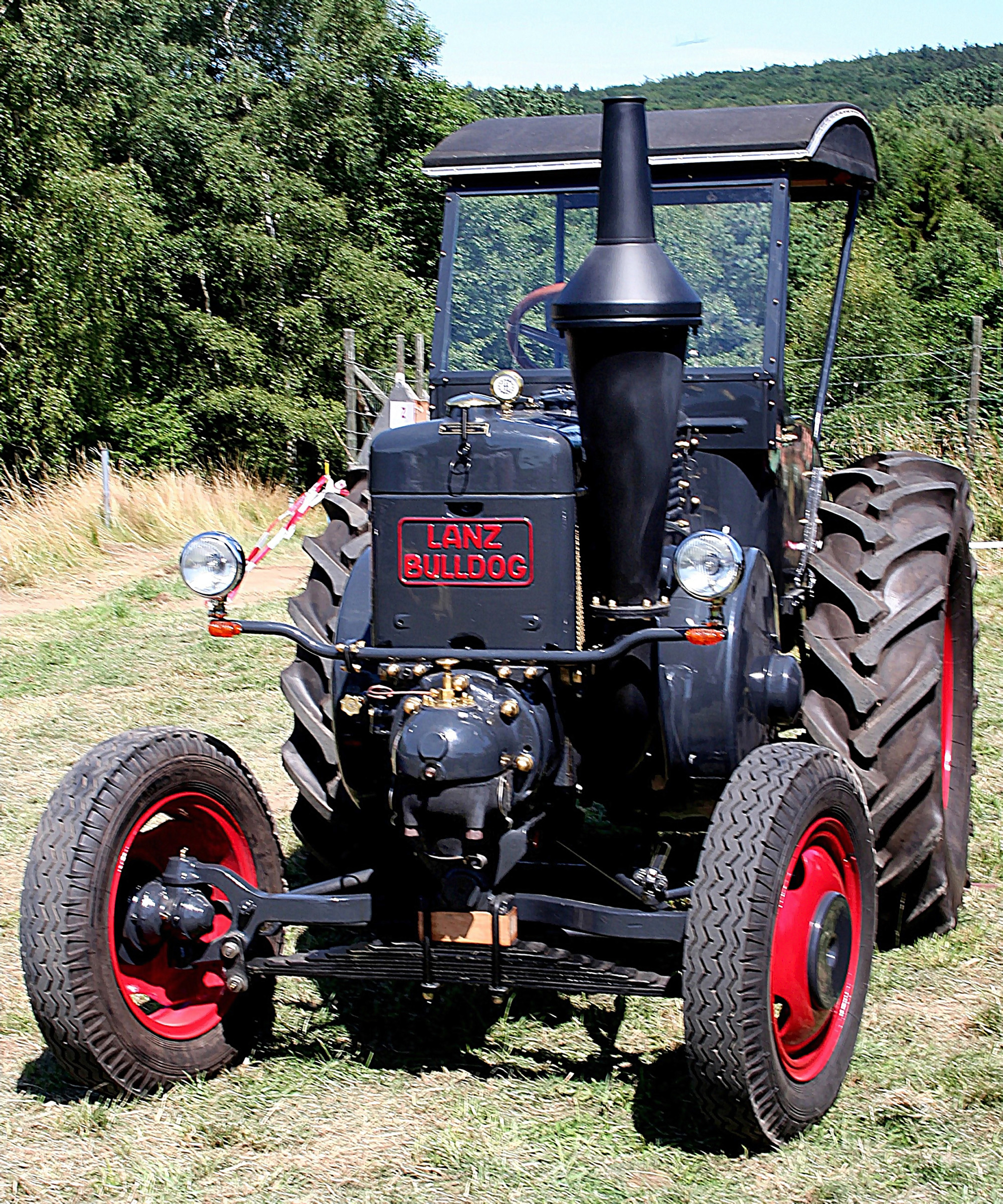
1939 Lanz Bulldog, a tractor built around a hot-bulb engine

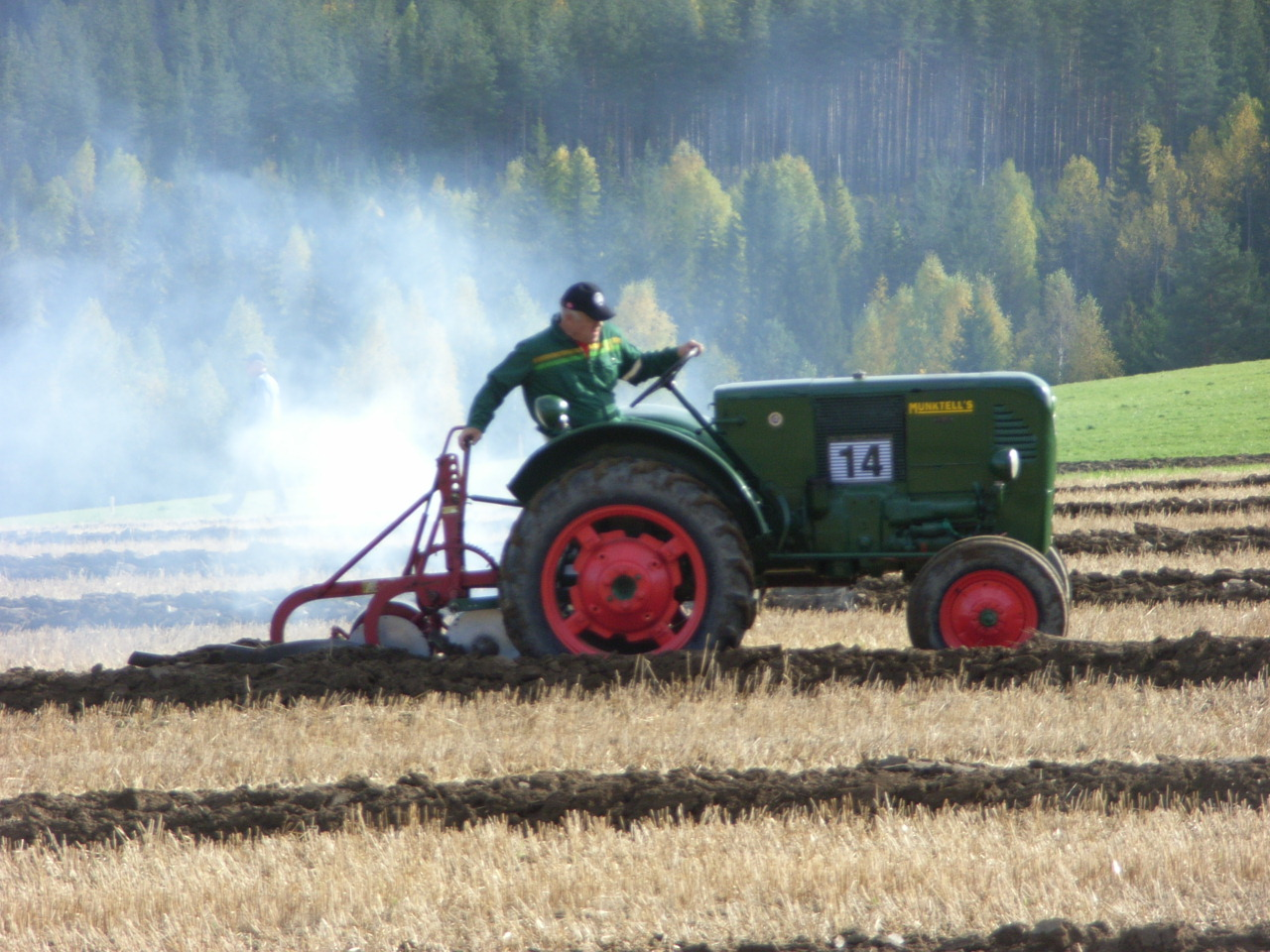
Bolinder-Munktell BM-10 with two-cylinder hot-bulb engine, produced 1947–1952

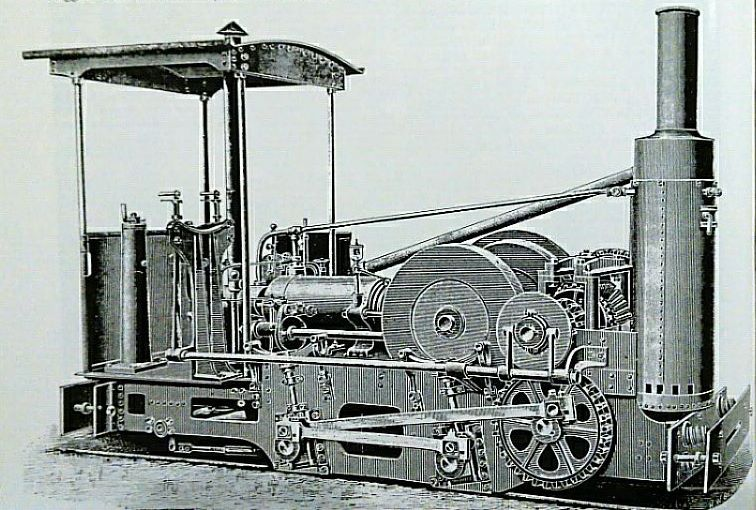
Hornsby–Akroyd Lachesis, a locomotive powered by a hot-bulb engine

The reliability of the hot-bulb engine, their ability to run on many fuels and the fact that they can be left running for hours or days at a time made them extremely popular with agricultural, forestry and marine users, where they were used for pumping and for powering milling, sawing and threshing machinery. Hot-bulb engines were also used on road rollers and tractors.

J. V. Svenssons Motorfabrik, in Augustendal in Stockholm, Sweden, used hot-bulb engines in their Typ 1 motor plough, produced from 1912 to 1925. Munktells Mekaniska Verkstads AB, in Eskilstuna, Sweden, produced agricultural tractors with hot-bulb engines from 1913 onwards. Heinrich Lanz AG, in Mannheim, Germany, started to use hot-bulb engines in 1921, in the Lanz HL tractor. Other well known tractor manufacturers that used bulb engines were Bubba, Gambino, Landini and Orsi in Italy, HSCS in Hungary, SFV in France, and Ursus in Poland (who produced the Ursus C-45, a direct copy of the 1934 Lanz Bulldog D 9506, after World War II).

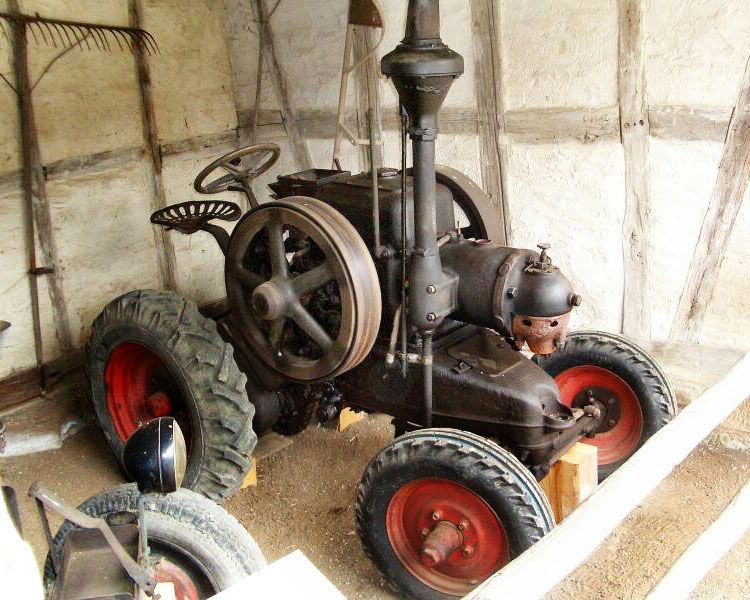
A 1928 Lanz Bulldog tractor. The hot bulb is immediately above the front axle, mounted on the front of the cylinder block.

At the start of the 20th century there were several hundred European manufacturers of hot-bulb engines for marine use. In Sweden alone there were over 70 manufacturers, of which Bolinder is the best known; in the 1920s they had about 80% of the world market. The Norwegian Sabb was a very popular hot-bulb engine for small fishing boats, and many of them are still in working order. The Rubbestadneset-based Wichmann factory produced 2stroke 4 cylinder glow bulb engines who were popular in the many ferry services in the Western Norwegian Fjords. They were connected to a controllable pitch propeller system and just added fuel by nearly constant RPM to increase power. These engines were heated up by glowtorches connected to pressurized air cylinders avoiding glow-torch operation. The pressurized air of about 12-14 kg/cqcm would be obtained by sluicing some of the combustion gasses off close to piston top position. These engines were started by applying compressed air to two of the 4 cylinders. In America, Standard, Weber, Reid, Stickney, Oil City, and Fairbanks Morse built hot-bulb engines.

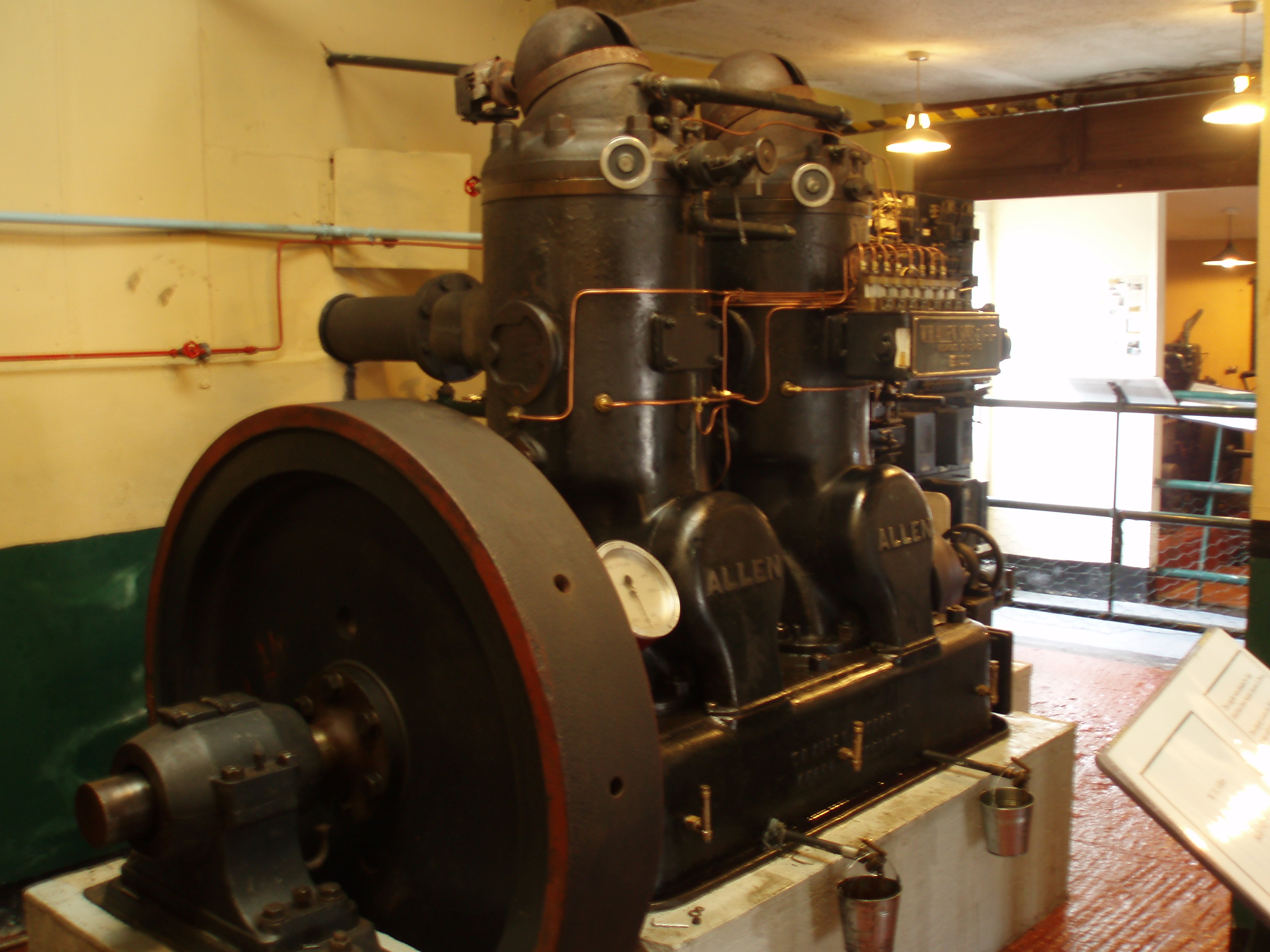
A vertical twin-cylinder hot-bulb engine, developing 70 horsepower. This engine has a top speed of 325 revolutions per minute.

A limitation of the design of the engine was that it could only run over quite a narrow (and low) speed band, typically 50 to 300 rpm. This made the hot-bulb engine difficult to adapt to automotive uses, other than vehicles such as tractors, where speed was not a major requirement. This limitation was of little consequence for stationary applications, where the hot-bulb engine was very popular.

Owing to the lengthy pre-heating time, hot-bulb engines only found favour with users who needed to run engines for long periods of time, where the pre-heating process only represented a small percentage of the overall running period. This included marine use — especially in fishing boats — and pumping or drainage duties.

The hot-bulb engine was invented at the same time that dynamos and electric light systems were perfected, and electricity generation was one of the hot-bulb engine's main uses. The engine could achieve higher rotational speed than a standard reciprocating steam engine, although high-speed steam engines were developed during the 1890s, and its low fuel and maintenance requirements, including the ability to be operated and maintained by only one person, made it ideal for small-scale power generation. Generator sets driven by hot-bulb engines were installed in numerous large houses in Europe, especially in rural areas, as well as in factories, theatres, lighthouses, radio stations and many other locations where a centralised electrical grid was not available. Usually, the dynamo or alternator would be driven off the engine's flywheel by a flat belt, to allow the necessary gearing up – making the generator turn at a faster speed than the engine. Companies such as Armstrong Whitworth and Boulton Paul manufactured and supplied complete generating sets, both the engine and generator, from the 1900s to the late 1920s, when the formation of national grid systems throughout the world and the replacement of the hot-bulb engine by the diesel engine caused a drop in demand.

The engines were also used in areas where the fire of a steam engine would be an unacceptable fire risk. Akroyd-Stuart developed the world's first locomotive powered by a hot-bulb oil engine, the Lachesis, for the Royal Arsenal, Woolwich, where the use of locomotives had previously been impossible due to the risk. Hot-bulb engines proved very popular for industrial engines in the early 20th century, but lacked the power to be used in anything larger.

== Replacement ==
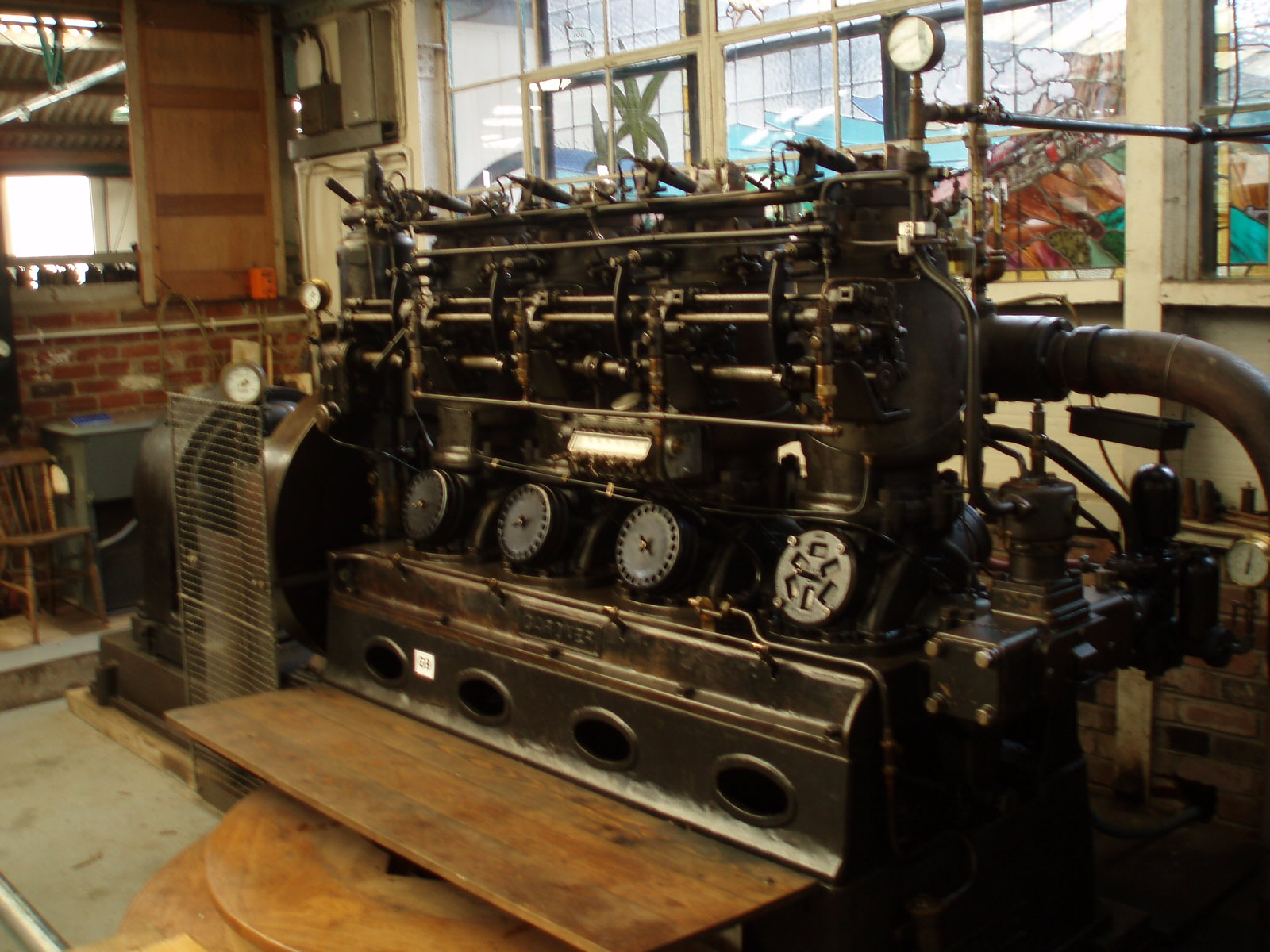
A Gardner 4T5 four-cylinder hot bulb engine on display at the Anson Engine Museum, Poynton, Cheshire, UK

From around 1910, the diesel engine was improved dramatically, with more power being available at greater efficiencies than the hot bulb engine could manage. Diesel engines can achieve over 50% efficiency if designed with maximum economy in mind, and they offered greater power for a given engine size due to the more efficient combustion method. They had no hot bulb, relying purely on compression-ignition, and offered greater ease of use, as they required no pre-heating.

The hot bulb engine was limited in its scope in terms of speed and overall power-to-size ratio. To make a hot bulb engine capable of powering a ship or locomotive, it would have been prohibitively large and heavy. The hot bulb engines used in Landini tractors were as much as 20 litres in capacity for relatively low power outputs. The main limit of the hot bulb engine's power and speed was its method of combustion. In a diesel engine combustion is controlled by injecting fuel into compressed air; since no combustion can take place until fuel is injected, the timing and duration of combustion can be tightly controlled. In the hot bulb engine, fuel was injected into the cylinder before compression began, and combustion would start as the air charge met the vaporised fuel in the hot bulb during the compression stroke. This meant that combustion was difficult to control to any degree of precision. Parts of the fuel charge throughout the hot bulb would ignite at different times, often before the piston had completed the compression stroke. This is identical to preignition in a conventional spark-ignition engine, and leads to uneven forces and high thermal and physical stresses on the engine's internal parts, especially the piston. In the hot bulb engine, this problem could only be overcome by keeping the overall engine speeds low, the fuel quantity injected in each cycle small, and the engine's components very heavily built. This resulted in a very durable engine, but also one which was large and heavy, while producing a relatively low power output. Ideas such as water injection (to reduce preignition) and the hot-tube engine (which allowed the volume of the vaporiser to be altered with engine speed, thus changing the overall compression ratio) added complexity and cost and still could not provide power-to-weight ratios in the same league as the rapidly developing diesel engine.

It is difficult to create even combustion throughout the multiple hot bulbs in multi-cylinder engines. The hot bulb engine's low compression ratio in comparison to diesel engines limited its efficiency, power output and speed. Most hot bulb engines could run at a maximum speed of around 100 rpm, while by the 1930s high-speed diesel engines capable of 2,000 rpm were being built. Also, due to the design of hot bulbs and the limitations of current technology in regard to the injector system, most hot bulb engines were single-speed engines, running at a fixed speed, or in a very narrow speed range. Diesel engines can be designed to operate over a much wider speed range, making them more versatile. This made these medium-sized diesels a very popular choice for use in generator sets, replacing the hot bulb engine as the engine of choice for small-scale power generation.

The development of small-capacity, high-speed diesel engines in the 1930s and 1940s, led to hot bulb engines falling dramatically out of favour. The last large-scale manufacturer of hot bulb engines stopped producing them in the 1950s and they are now virtually extinct in commercial use, except in very remote areas of the developing world. An exception to this is marine use; hot bulb engines were widely fitted to inland barges and narrowboats in Europe. The United Kingdom's first two self-powered motor narrowboats—Cadbury's Bournville I and Bournville II in 1911—were powered by 15 horsepower Bolinder single-cylinder hot bulb engines, and this type became common between the 1920s and the 1950s. With hot bulb engines being generally long-lived and ideally suited to such a use, it is not uncommon to find vessels still fitted with their original hot bulb engines today.

Although there is a common misconception that model glow plug engines are a variation of the hot bulb engine, this is not the case. Model glow engines are catalytic ignition engines. They take advantage of a reaction between platinum in the glow plug coil and methyl alcohol vapour whereby at certain temperatures and pressures platinum will glow in contact with the vapour.

== Hot bulb pseudo-diesel development ==
=== 1890s–1910 ===
The hot bulb engine is often confused with the diesel engine, which is primarily caused by the fact that hot-bulb engines often run on diesel fuel, and because the hot bulb is not immediately recognised as an ignition device.

The hot bulb engine mostly reuses the heat retained in the vaporiser to ignite the fuel, achieving about 12% efficiency. The diesel engine uses only compression to ignite the fuel. It operates at pressures many times higher than the hot bulb engine, resulting in over 50% efficiency with large diesels. A diesel engine can start – even without preheating – if sufficient compression work is provided. A hot-bulb engine cannot do this because it relies on hot-bulb ignition rather than compression ignition.

There is also a crucial difference in the timing of the fuel injection process: In the hot bulb engine, fuel is injected into the vaporiser, during the intake stroke. In a diesel engine, fuel is injected into the combustion chamber at the end of the compression stroke, shortly before the top dead center is reached. Furthermore, neither particularly precise, nor particularly high-pressure fuel injection is required in a hot-bulb engine. The hot bulb engine thus uses a medium-pressure pump to deliver fuel to the cylinder, through a simple nozzle. Diesel engines require sophisticated fuel injection systems.

In this period diesel and hot bulb engines were four stroke. In 1902 F. Rundlof invented the two-stroke crankcase scavenged engine that went on to become the prevalent hot bulb type engine.

=== 1910–1950s ===
Small direct-injected diesel engines still were not practical and the prechambered indirect injection engine was invented, along with the requirement of glowplugs to be used for starting. With technology developed by Robert Bosch GmbH pump and injector systems could be built to run at a much higher pressure. Combined with high-precision injectors, high-speed diesels were produced from 1927.

The hot bulbs started to develop cracks and breakups and were gradually replaced by water cooled cylinder heads with a flat hot spot. Over time the compression ratios were increased from 3:1 to 14:1. Fuel injection started from 135 degrees before top dead center with low compression down to 20 degrees before top dead center with later higher compression engines increasing the hot air factor for ignition and increasing the fuel efficiency. Glowplugs finally replaced the preheating with a blowtorch methods and engine speeds were increased, resulting in what is now classified as an indirect-injection diesel.

Hot bulb or prechambered engines were always easier to produce, more reliable and could handle smaller amounts of fuel in smaller engines than the direct-injected "pure" diesels could.

== Production ==
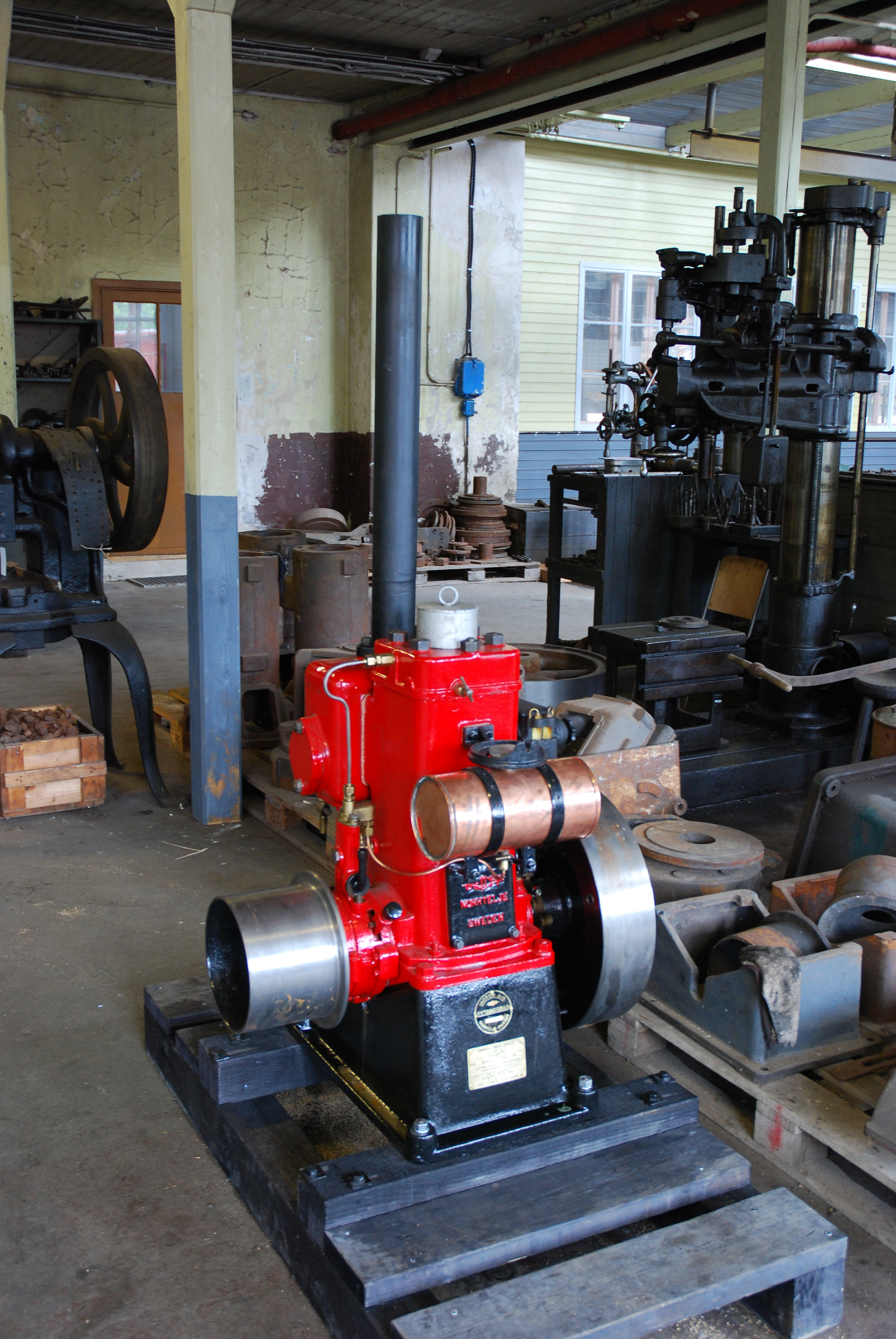
A Drott hot-bulb engine, manufactured at the Pythagoras Mechanical Workshop Museum in Norrtälje, Sweden, after original drawings from the Pythagoras Engine Factory

Hot-bulb engines were built by a large number of manufacturers, usually in modest series. These engines were slow-running (300–400 rpm) and mostly with cast-iron parts, including pistons. The fuel pump was usually made with a brass housing and steel plunger, operating with a variable stroke length. This resulted in a simple, rugged heavy engine.

Therefore, they could be machined in an average machine shop without special tools. Even small smithys, boatyards, ironmongers and machine shops with traditional tools and skills could make hot-bulb engines. These could be completed from bought-in unfinished castings, made from provided blueprints, a licensed (or often unlicensed) copy of a factory-made engine, a workshop or individual's own variant on a reference design - often mixing features of several different manufacturers or an entirely original variant on the basic hot-bulb design.

While spark-ignition and diesel engines nearly always had to be bought in from dedicated manufacturers, the hot-bulb engine was simple and cost-effective enough to produce that boatyards, agricultural implement makers, millwrights and similar businesses could design, build and fit their own engines to their respective products. This was especially the case in areas of the world where transporting an engine from a dedicated builder across long distances and/or harsh terrain was impractical and expensive and only a relatively simple and low-power engine was required.

This led to a plethora of hot-bulb engine builders, few of which built engines to any recognisable standard design or series production and in small overall numbers. Other local engine shops turned out hot-bulb designs either licensed, cloned or inspired by multiple different established builders, depending on the requirements of each individual customer.

The Pythagoras Engine Factory in Norrtälje in Sweden is kept as a museum (the Pythagoras Mechanical Workshop Museum) and has a functioning production line and extensive factory archives.

== See also ==
- Crude oil engine
- Hesselman engine
- Fuel injection
- Gasoline direct injection
- Prosper L'Orange

== Patents ==
- US Patent 845140 Combustion Engine, dated February 26, 1907.
- US Patent 502837 Engine operated by the explosion of mixtures of gas or hydrocarbon vapor and air, dated August 8, 1893.
- US Patent 439702 Petroleum Engine or Motor, dated November 4, 1890.
