= Richard Hornsby =

Richard Hornsby (Elsham in Lincolnshire 4 June 1790 – 6 January 1864) was an English inventor and founder of a major agricultural machinery firm that developed steam engines. His firm also developed early diesels and caterpillar tracks. He came from a farming family, the son of William Hornsby and his wife Sarah.

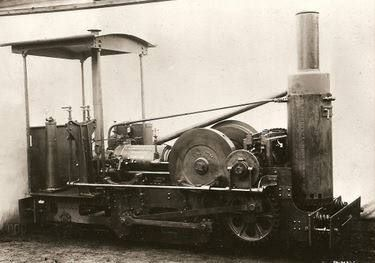
Hornsby kerosene locomotive "Lachesis" of 1896

== Formation of company ==
In 1805, at the age of fifteen, he started his apprenticeship for Havercroft Wheelwright in Barnetby (North Lincolnshire). He came to Grantham in 1810 looking for work. He approached Richard Seaman, the village blacksmith of Barrowby. When working in Barrowby, he had the idea to put a set of wheels on an adjustable harrow. Seeing this inventiveness, Seaman offered him a partnership in his company. Seaman & Hornsby was started in 1812 with business partner and blacksmith, Richard Seaman, a fellow methodist. The firm became Richard Hornsby & Sons in 1828, when Seaman retired. The company made ploughs and seed drills. By 1840, the company made steam engines, which were used for traction engines in the 1850s. These were used for harvesting crops.

After Hornsby's death, his firm built the first working (experimental) diesel engine in 1892; it went on to develop the continuous track for agricultural usage in 1905, which revolutionized land warfare.

== Personal life and family ==
Five of his children were Richard (born 1827), Louisa, James (born 1836), Helen Mary Anne and William (born 1838).

He died on 6 January 1864. His wife, Mary, died on 15 October 1866, aged 66. At the time of his death he had eight grandchildren. Two of his great-grand children would go to Eton. Although there is no monument to Richard Hornsby, one of his great-grandsons, Richard William Hornsby, is listed on the war memorial in Barrowby, after being killed in the First World War in Greece. His family were quite wealthy, owning 421 acres (1.70 km^{2}) of land, as the Hornsby company was a world leader in engine manufacture, until 1918.
