= Hornsby–Akroyd oil engine =

Early internal combustion engine design

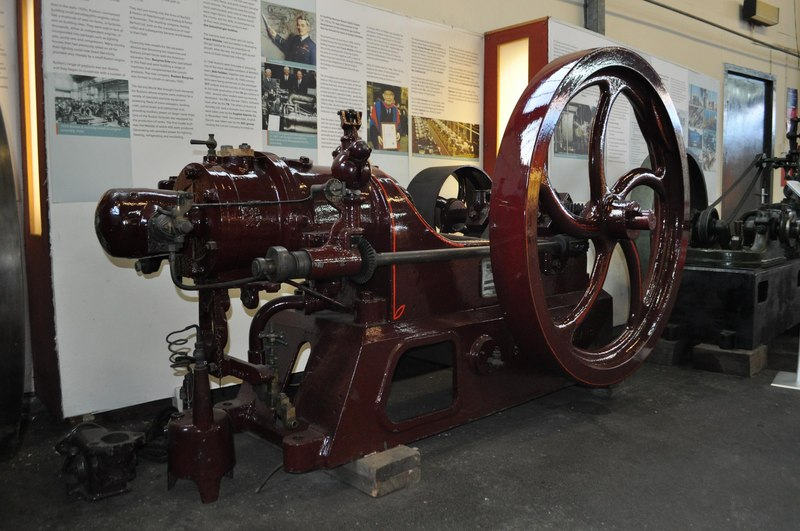
1893 Hornsby–Akroyd oil engine at the museum of Lincolnshire life, Lincoln, England

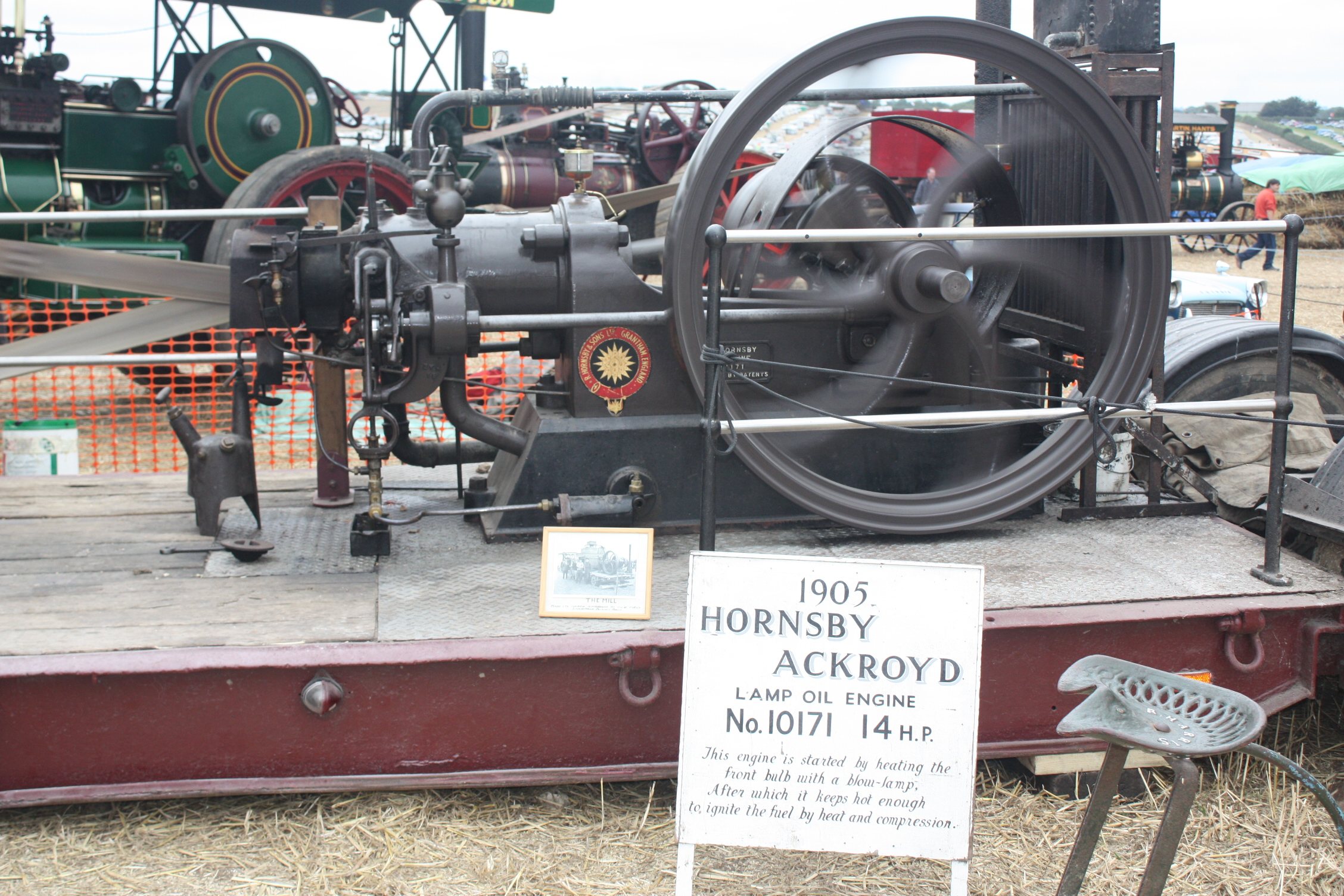
14 hp Hornsby–Akroyd oil engine at the Great Dorset Steam Fair in 2008

The Hornsby–Akroyd oil engine, named after its inventor Herbert Akroyd Stuart and the manufacturer Richard Hornsby & Sons, was the first successful design of an internal combustion engine using heavy oil as a fuel. It was the first to use a separate vapourising combustion chamber and is the forerunner of all hot-bulb engines, which are considered predecessors of the similar Diesel engine, developed a few years later.

Early internal combustion engines were quite successful running on gaseous and light petroleum fuels. However, due to the dangerous nature of petroleum and light petroleum fuel, legal restrictions were placed on their transportation and storage. Heavier petroleum fuels, such as kerosene, were quite prevalent, as they were used for lighting, but posed specific problems when used in internal combustion engines: Oil used for engine fuel must be turned to a vapour state and remain in that state during compression. Furthermore, the combustion of the fuel must be powerful, regular, and complete, to avoid deposits that will clog the valves and working parts of the engine.

== Early oil engines ==
The earliest mention of an oil engine was by Robert Street, in his English patent no. 1983 of 1794, and according to Horst O. Hardenberg there is evidence that he built a working version. Other oil engines were subsequently built by Etienne Lenoir, Siegfried Marcus, Julius Hock of Vienna and George Brayton in the 19th century. In 1807 Nicéphore Niépce built a working moss and coal powder powered engine, the Pyreolophore, which powered a boat upstream on the River Saône. All of these engines with the exception of Brayton's were non-compression.

Others made refinements to the oil engine; William Dent Priestman and Emile Capitaine are some of the more notable. However, it was Herbert Akroyd Stuart's design that was the most successful.

== Herbert Akroyd Stuart’s engine ==
Diagram of early vaporizing oil engine

Herbert Akroyd Stuart's first prototype engines were built in 1886. In 1890, in collaboration with Charles Richard Binney, he filed Patent 7146 for Richard Hornsby & Sons of Grantham, Lincolnshire, England. The patent was entitled: Improvements in Engines Operated by the Explosion of Mixtures of Combustible Vapour or Gas and Air.

=== Vapourising combustion chamber ===
Stuart's oil engine design was simple, reliable and economical. It had a comparatively low compression ratio, so that the temperature of the air compressed in the combustion chamber at the end of the compression stroke was not high enough to initiate combustion. Combustion instead took place in a separated combustion chamber, the vapouriser (also called the hot bulb) mounted on the cylinder head, into which fuel was sprayed. It was connected to the cylinder by a narrow passage and was heated either by the cylinder's coolant or by exhaust gases while running; an external flame such as a blowtorch was used for starting. Self-ignition occurred from contact between the fuel-air mixture and the hot walls of the vapouriser.

By contracting the bulb to a very narrow neck where it attached to the cylinder, a high degree of turbulence was set up as the ignited gases flashed through the neck into the cylinder, where combustion was completed. As the engine's load increased, so did the temperature of the bulb, causing the ignition period to advance; to counteract pre-ignition, water was dripped into the air intake.

=== Four-stroke oil engine ===
The Stuart engine is of four cycle design. During the intake stroke (1), fresh air is inducted into the cylinder through a mechanically operated intake valve. Simultaneously, oil is injected into the vapouriser. The vapour of the oil is almost entirely confined to the vapouriser chamber. This cloud of hot oil vapour is too rich to support combustion. On the compression stroke (2) of the piston, the fresh air is forced through the narrow neck and into the vapouriser. Just as compression is completed, the mixture is just right to support combustion and ignition occurs to push the piston during expansion stroke (3). Exhaust gas is released then during stroke (4).

=== Two-stroke hot-bulb engines ===
Some years later, Akroyd-Stuart's design was further developed in the United States by the German emigrants August Mietz (?-1915) and Carl Wilhelm Weiss (1858-1940), who combined the hot-bulb engine with the two-stroke scavenging principle, developed by Joseph Day to provide nearly twice the power, as compared to a four-stroke engine of same size. Similar engines, for agricultural and marine use, were built by J. V. Svensons Automobilfabrik, Bolinders, Lysekils Mekaniska Verkstad, Pythagoras Engine Factory and many other factories in Sweden.

=== Comparison to the Diesel engine ===
Akroyd-Stuart's engine was the first internal combustion engine to use a pressurised fuel injection system and also the first using a separate vapourising combustion chamber. It is the forerunner of all hot-bulb engines, which are considered kind of predecessors of the similar Diesel engine, developed a few years later.

However, the Hornsby–Akroyd oil engine and other hot-bulb engines are distinctly different from Rudolf Diesel's design, where ignition occurs alone through the heat of compression: An oil engine will have a decent compression ratio between 3:1 and 5:1, where a typical diesel engine will have a much harder achieved compression ratio ranging between 15:1 and 20:1, making it a lot more efficient. Also the fuel is injected easily during the early intake stroke and not at the peak of compression with a high-pressure Diesel injection pump.

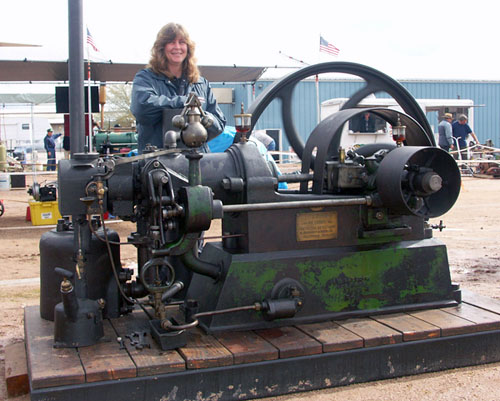
Vapourising oil engine

== First production oil engine ==
Akroyd-Stuart's engines were built from 26 June 1891 by Richard Hornsby & Sons in Grantham, a large manufacturer of steam engines and agricultural equipment, as the Hornsby Akroyd Patent Oil Engine under licence and were first sold commercially on 8 July 1892. Other engineering companies had been offered the option of manufacturing the engine, but they saw it as a threat to their business, and so declined the offer.

== Adaption to compression ignition ==
In 1892, T. H. Barton at Hornsbys enhanced the engine by replacing the vaporiser with a new cylinder head and increased the compression ratio to make the engine run on compression alone pre-dating Rudolph Diesel's engine. This Hornsby–Akroyd oil engine design was hugely successful: during the period from 1891 through 1905, a total of 32,417 engines were produced. They would provide electricity for lighting the Taj Mahal, the Rock of Gibraltar, the Statue of Liberty (chosen after Hornsby won the oil engine prize at the Chicago World's Fair of 1893), many lighthouses, and for powering Guglielmo Marconi's first transatlantic radio broadcast.

== See also ==
- Hot-bulb engine
- History of the internal combustion engine
