= Pythagoras Mechanical Workshop Museum =

Working life museum in Norrtälje, Sweden

Coordinates: 59°45′21″N 18°41′59″E

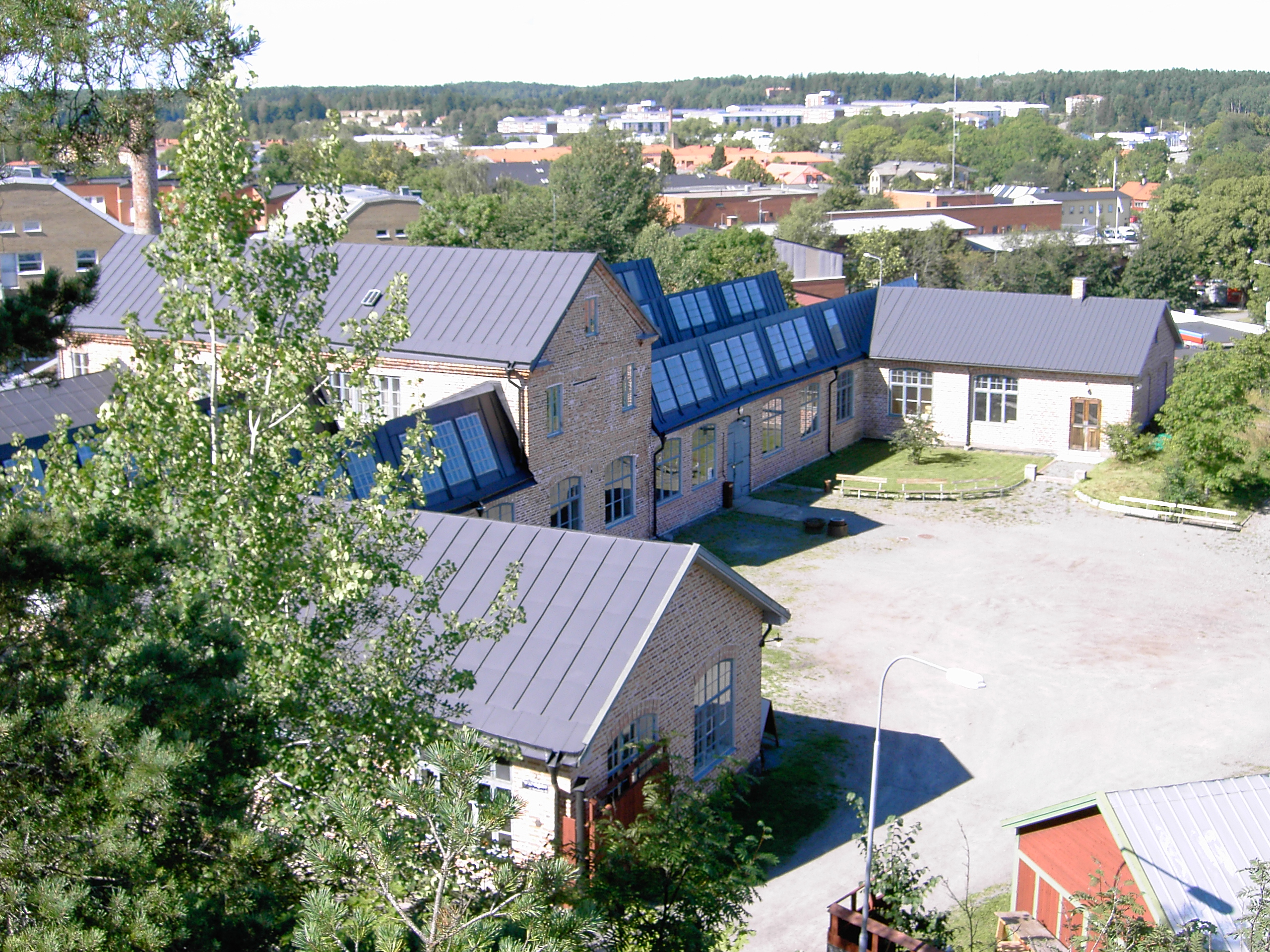
Pythagoras Mechanical Workshop Museum

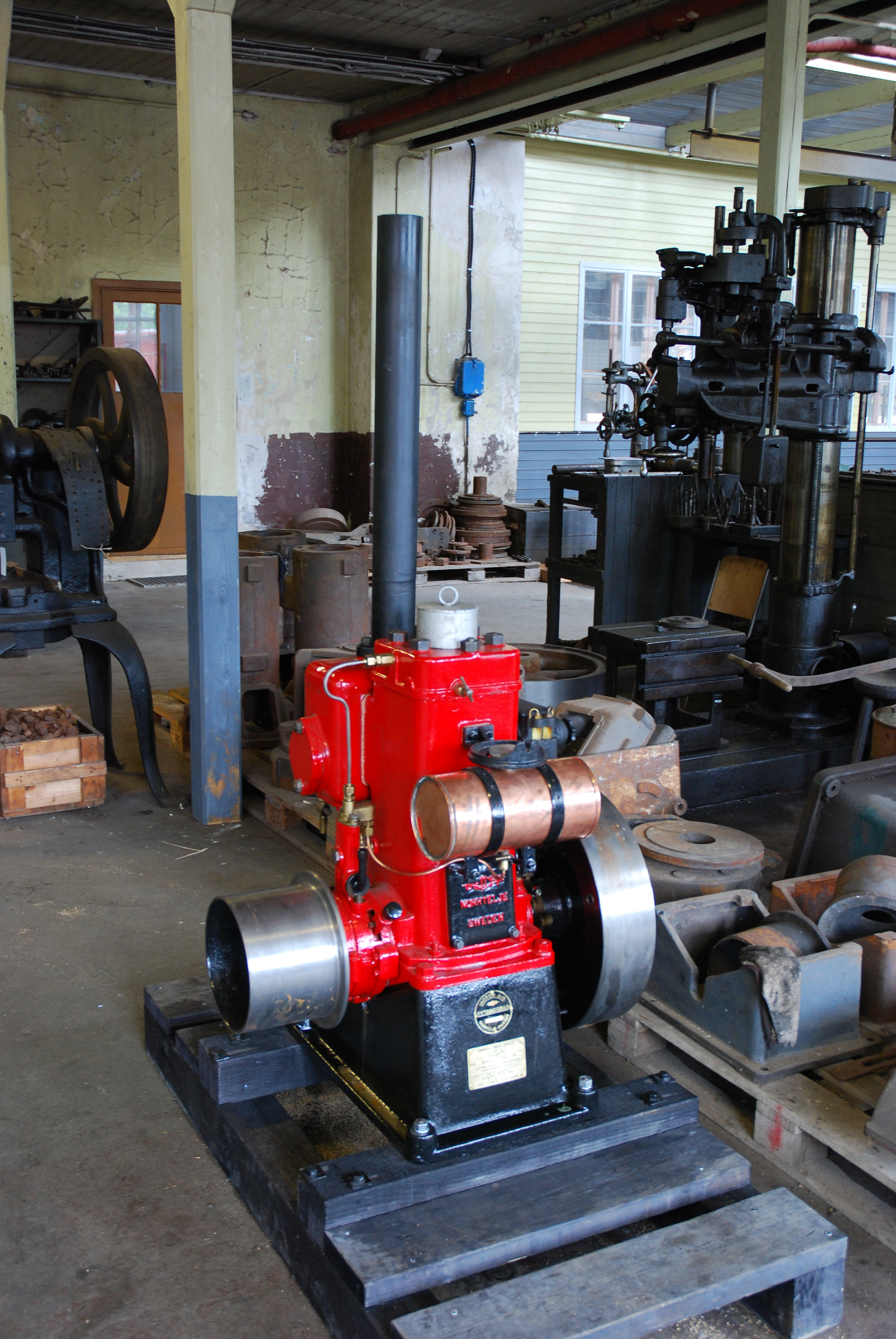
Engine of the trade mark Drott, built at the Pythagoras Mechanical Workshop Museum from original drawings from the Pythagoras Engine Factory

Pythagoras Mechanical Workshop Museum (Swedish: Pythagoras industrimuseum) is located in the premises of the earlier engine factory Pythagoras at the town of Norrtälje in the province of Uppland in Sweden. At the museum, production facilities and working conditions from the first half of the 20th century are on display. The factory produced hot bulb engines and spare parts for them from 1908 up to closure of the workshop in 1979. The engine factory is an industrial heritage site, complete with functioning production lines and offices.

== Pythagoras company ==
The company was founded in 1898 as Verkstads AB Pythagoras (Pythagoras Mechanical Workshop Ltd.), originally to produce mechanical calculators, hence its name from the Greek mathematician and philosopher Pythagoras. However, these plans failed and the factory instead started producing locks, brass candlesticks and electrical fittings. Beginning in 1908 hot bulb engines were designed and manufactured, and such engines afterwards dominated the production line of the Pythagoras factory.

== New Pythagoras ==
After a bankruptcy in 1927 the company was reconstituted as Nya AB Pythagoras (New Pythagoras Ltd.). A new bankruptcy followed during the Great Depression, in 1933, but it was reorganized once more. From 1957 and onwards, under new owners, the production was step by step reduced.

== Fram and Drott ==
Pythagoras manufactured hot bulb engines under the trademarks of Fram and Drott, the latter for export markets. The engines were used in farm machinery and on fishing and other vessels. The company was, with about 80 employees, once the largest manufacturer in Norrtälje.

== Pythagoras today ==
The factory was threatened by demolition in the early 1980s, but was rescued by a group of local enthusiasts. Nowadays the Pythagoras Engine Factory is recognized as one of the most valuable industrial heritage monuments in Sweden. The Pythagoras Mechanical Workshop Museum is owned by the Engine Factory Pythagoras Foundation, which runs it in cooperation with the support group Pythagoras Vänner (The Friends of Pythagoras).

== Further reading (in Swedish) ==
- Dag Avango: Motorfabriken Pythagoras – En levande verkstadsindustri och kulturmiljö, 1998, ISBN 978-91-630-6934-5
- Jan-Bertil Schnell: ”Motorfabriken Pythagoras, ett törnroseslott i Roslagen”, in the 1993 yearbook of the Swedish Tourist Association
