= Lance (disambiguation) =

A lance is a pole weapon based on the spear.

Lance may also refer to:

== People ==
- Lance (given name), including a list of people with the name
- Lance (surname), including a list of people with the name

== In the military ==
- USS Lance (AM-257), a United States Navy World War II minesweeper
- MGM-52 Lance, a former United States Army mobile field artillery tactical surface-to-surface missile system
- Lance corporal, a military rank
- Lances fournies, a military unit centred on an armoured knight and his retinue

== Places ==
- Lance, Missouri, a community in the United States
- Łańce, a village in Poland
- Lancé, a commune in Centre-Val de Loire, France

== Transportation ==
- Piper PA-32R "Lance", a single-engine light airplane produced by Piper Aircraft
- Dennis Lance, a single-decker bus chassis manufactured by Dennis Specialist Vehicles
- Lance, a South Devon Railway Comet class steam locomotive

== Other uses ==
- Lance (film), a 2020 documentary about cyclist Lance Armstrong
- Lance Powersports, a scooter company
- Lance!, a Brazilian daily sports newspaper
- Lance Inc., a snack food company
- Lancet or lance, a type of medical scalpel with one or two sharp points that is typically used to make small puncture-type incision in the skin to drain puss or fluid
- AMD Lance Am7990 (Local Area Network Controller for Ethernet), an AMD Ethernet computer chip
- Lance, a game piece in shogi
- Lance or sand lance, various fish in the family Ammodytidae (sand eels)
- Oxygen lance, a pipe used in basic oxygen steelmaking
- The Lance, a student newspaper

== See also ==
- Lancer (disambiguation)
- Lancet (disambiguation)
- Lancing (disambiguation)
- Lantz (disambiguation)
- Lanz (disambiguation)
- Incision and drainage, known in the past as lancing, or to lance
