= Lanz =

Lanz may refer to:

== Places ==
- Lanz, Brandenburg, a municipality in Brandenburg, Germany
- a village in the municipality Störnstein in Bavaria, Germany
- Lanz, German name from Lomnice, a village in Sokolov District, Czech Republic
- Lanz Peak in Antarctica
- Lanz Point, Saskatchewan, a hamlet in Canada
- Lanz and Cox Islands Provincial Park in British Columbia, Canada

== Companies and brands ==
- Heinrich Lanz AG, German pioneer and manufacturer of agricultural machinery from 1859 to 1956
  - Lanz Bulldog, agricultural machinery
  - Schütte-Lanz-Luftschiffe, rigid airships

== Other ==
- Lanz (surname)
- 683 Lanzia, an asteroid in the Main Belt named after Heinrich Lanz
- 700 Auravictrix, an asteroid in the Main Belt named after a Schütte-Lanz Zeppelin
- Order of the New Templars, founded by Lanz von Liebenfels
- Lanz, a character from Xenoblade Chronicles 3

== See also ==
- Lantz (disambiguation)
