= Lanz HL =

Tractor model

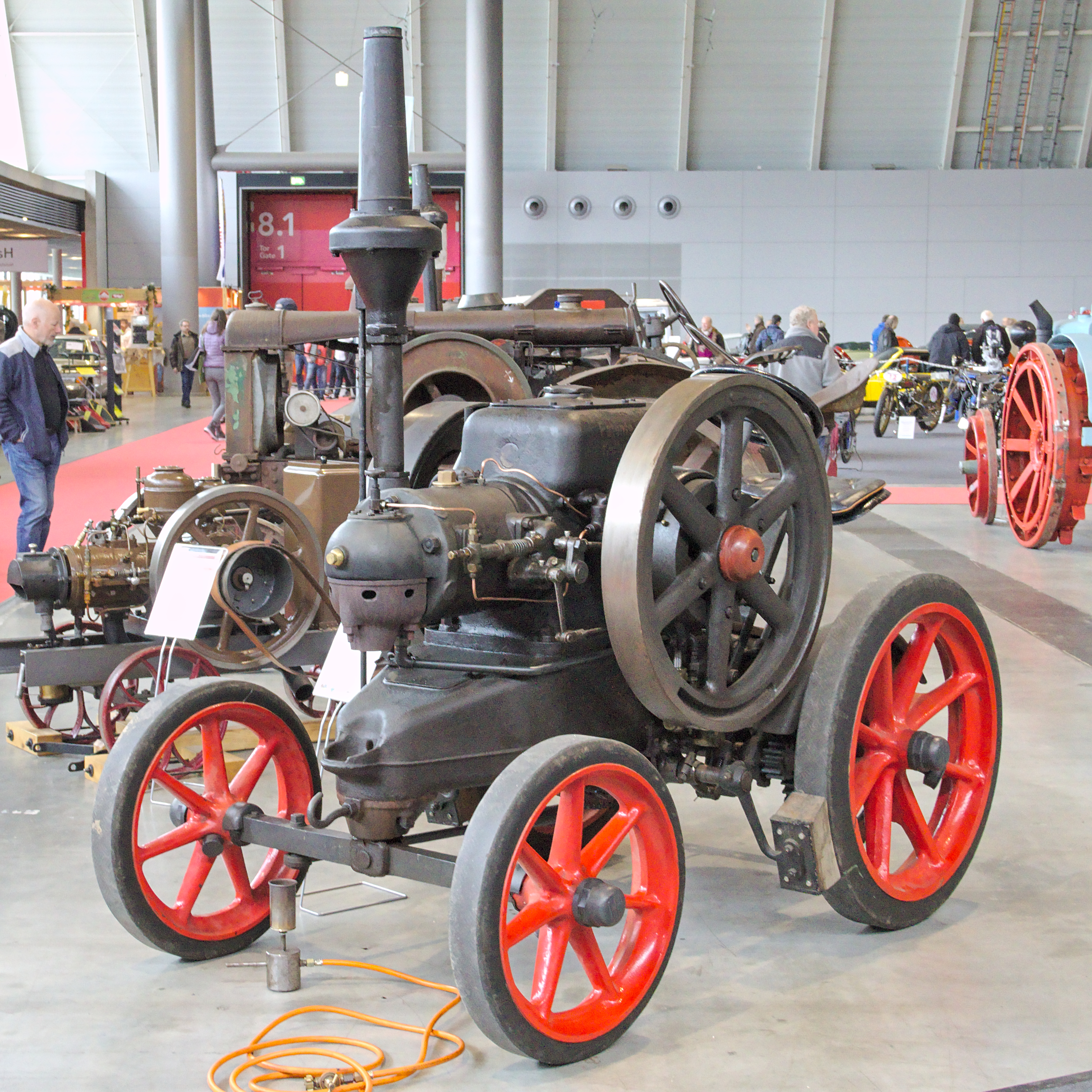
- Lanz HL Gummibuldog
- Type: Agricultural
- Manufacturer: Heinrich Lanz & Co. OHG
- Production: 1921-1927
- Length: 2250 mm
- Width: 1370 mm
- Height: 2195 mm
- Weight: 1850...2360 kg
- Propulsion: Steel or rubber wheels
- Engine model: "Bulldog" single-cylinder Akroyd engine
- Engine displacement: 6238 cm^{3}
- Transmission: None
- Wheelbase: 1390 mm
- Flywheel power: 12 PS (9 kW)
- Belt power: 12 PS (9 kW)
- Speed: 4.2 km/h
- Succeeded by: Lanz HR

The Lanz HL, also known as Lanz Bulldog HL and Lanz Bulldog HL 12, is an agricultural machine and tractor made by Heinrich Lanz & Co. OHG. It was developed by German engineer Fritz Huber and is the first Lanz tractor to feature the "Bulldog" Akroyd engine. Thus, it is the first series production Lanz Bulldog. The Lanz HL was introduced at the 1921 DLG agriculture fair in Leipzig and stayed in production until 1927. In total, more than 6,000 units were made. The HL Bulldog engine was also sold as a stationary engine; this article primarily describes the HL agricultural tractor.

== Technical description ==
The Lanz HL is an agricultural machine that resembles, in its default configuration, an agricultural tractor. Nonetheless, the Lanz HL was not primarily designed as a tractor; it is rather a self-propelled farm implement motor. Various different versions were made, with rubber or steel wheels. It uses a frameless design with the rear axle flange-mounted to a housing shaped like a "hull" that spans to the tractor's front. This "hull" contains the water tank for the cooling system and a toolbox. The rear axle is a live 90°-portal-type beam axle with a single-speed reduction gearbox and a differential gearbox; the front axle – that the "hull"-shaped housing sits atop on – is a dead boogie axle that does not have steering knuckles.

The Lanz HL has a worm-and-sector steering system and a conventional steering wheel. The engine is top flange-mounted to the "hull". Torque is sent to a pulley and torque take-off disc that can be engaged or disengaged through a simple lever-operated jaw-type clutch. From the pulley and torque take-off disc, torque can either be sent to a farm implement through a belt, or to the rear axle's reduction gearbox through a chain. This means that the drive chain has to be uninstalled when the Lanz HL is to be used as a farm implement motor. In its original configuration, the Lanz HL has no gearboxes other than the rear axle's reduction and differential gearboxes, which limits its top speed to 4.2 km/h. From 1923, Lanz offered an additional shiftable gearbox as a factory option. This gearbox has two speeds and has to be shifted while the vehicle is standing still. Due to the engine's design, it can run either clockwise or counterclockwise, which eliminates the need for a dedicated reverse gear or reverse gearbox. With the two-speed gearbox, speeds of up to 12 km/h, either forward or reverse, are possible. The brakes are simple shoe brakes that act directly on the wheels' treads.

The engine is a single-cylinder, two-stroke Akroyd engine designed by German engineer Fritz Huber (hence the name "HL", Huber Lanz). It is named the "Bulldog" engine because of its ignition device's characteristic appearance that bears resemblance to a bulldog. The Bulldog engine of the HL has intake ports instead of valves and uses simple evaporative cooling. The water vapour leaves the engine through the exhaust of the engine. With its bore of 190 mm and its stroke of 220 mm it displaces 6238 cm^{3}. The rated power output is 12 PS (ca. 9 kW) at 420/min. Later versions of the same engine were also offered with 15 PS (ca. 11 kW) at 500/min for stationary applications. The Bulldog engine can burn a huge variety of liquid fuels, most notably cheap fuel oils. The fuel is sprayed into the ignition device – an uncooled portion of the cylinder head – where it vapourises and eventually gradually combusts. Thus, the engine needs no carburetor like Otto engines, and no high compression like Diesel engines (in the Bulldog engine, the compression is ε≤5). Prior to starting the engine, the ignition device has to be brought to ignition temperature using a blow torch. The engine is then flywheel-started by hand.
