= Lantz =

Lantz may refer to:

== People ==
- Lantz (surname), a surname of German and Swedish origin
- Lantz (given name)

== Places ==
=== Canada ===
- Lantz, Nova Scotia

=== Spain ===
- Lantz, Spain, Navarre

=== United States ===
- Lantz, West Virginia
- Lantz Arena in Charleston, Illinois
- Lantz Corners, Pennsylvania
- Lantz Farm and Nature Preserve Wildlife Management Area, West Virginia
- Lantz Hall, in Virginia
- Lantz Mill, in Virginia
- Lantz-Zeigler House, in Maryland

== See also ==
- Lantz v. Coleman, a Connecticut superior court case in the United States
- Lanz (disambiguation)
