= Lanzl =

Lanzl is a German surname. Notable people with the surname include:

- Andrea Lanzl (born 1987), German ice hockey player
- Michaela Lanzl (born 1983), German ice hockey player, sister of Andrea

== See also ==
- Lanz (surname)
- Lantz (surname)
