= Lance (given name) =

Lance is a given name. Notable people with the name include:

== People ==
=== Politicians ===
- Lance Cargill (born 1971), American politician and lawyer
- Lance Eads (born c. 1968), American politician
- Lance Mason (born 1967), American criminal and former politician
- Lance Smith (politician) (1910–2000), American politician
- Lance White (born 1946), Canadian politician

=== Sports ===
- Lance Alworth (born 1940), American Hall-of-Fame National Football League player
- Lance Anoa'i (born 1992), American professional wrestler
- Lance Archer (born 1977), American professional wrestler
- Lance Armstrong (born 1971), American road racing cyclist
- Lance Barrett (born 1984), American baseball umpire
- Lance Berkman (born 1976), American Major League Baseball player
- Lance Briggs (born 1980), American National Football League player
- Lance Cade (1981–2010), American professional wrestler
- Lance Franklin (born 1987), Australian rules footballer
- Lance Gunn (born 1970), American football player
- Lance Heard (born 2004), American football player
- Lance Johnson (born 1963), Major League Baseball outfielder
- Lance Klusener (born 1971), South African cricketer
- Lance Lenoir (born 1995), American football player
- Lance Lynn (born 1987), American baseball player
- Lance Macey (1881–1950), New Zealand lawn bowler
- Lance Mackey (1970–2022), American dog musher and dog sled racer
- Lance Macklin (1919–2002), British racing driver
- Lance Mason (American football) (born 2003), American football player
- Lance McCullers Jr. (born 1993), American Major League Baseball pitcher
- Lance McCutcheon (born 1999), American football player
- Lance Moore (born 1983), American football player
- Lance Parrish (born 1956), American Major League Baseball catcher
- Lance Smith (American football) (born 1963), American National Football League player
- Lance Stephenson (born 1990), American basketball player
- Lance Storm (born 1969), ring name of Canadian professional wrestler Lance Evers
- Lance Stroll (born 1998), Belgian-Canadian racing driver
- Lance Whitnall (born 1979), Australian rules footballer
- Lance Wilkinson (footballer) (1931–2011), Australian rules footballer

=== Military ===
- Lance Sijan (1942–1968), United States Air Force fighter pilot posthumously awarded the Medal of Honor
- Lance L. Smith (born 1946), United States Air Force general

=== Musicians ===
- Lance Bass (born 1979), American pop musician, member of 'N Sync
- Lance Robertson (born 1965), American musician, DJ, and television presenter

=== Actors ===
- Lance Dos Ramos (born 1985), Venezuelan actor
- Lance Gross (born 1981), Ghanaian-American actor, model, and photographer
- Lance Henriksen (born 1940), American actor
- Lance Kerwin (born 1960), American actor
- Lance LeGault (1935–2012), American actor
- Lance Percival (1933–2015), British actor, comedian and after-dinner speaker
- Lance Reddick (1962–2023), American actor and musician
- Lance (actor) (1962–1991), American actor and model

=== Others ===
- Lance Acord (born 1964), American cinematographer
- Lance Anderson, American makeup artist
- Lance Burton (born 1960), American professional magician
- Lance Castles (1937–2020), Australian scholar of Indonesian history, economics, and politics
- Lance E. Davis (1928–2014), American economic historian
- Lance Hool, Mexican film director and producer
- Lance Ito (born 1950), judge in the O.J. Simpson murder trial
- Lance Price (born 1958), British writer, journalist and political strategist

== Fictional characters ==
- Kamen Rider Lance, in Kamen Rider Blade
- Lance (Pokémon), the final member of Kanto's Elite Four and the champion of the Johto region
- Lance, one of Bow's fathers in She-Ra and the Princesses of Power''
- Lance (Voltron), a member of the Voltron Force
- Lance Hunter, a Marvel Comics character
- Lance Richmond, a character in Nexo Knights
- Lance Smart, in the Australian soap opera Home and Away
- Lance Sweets, in the television series Bones
- Lance Vance, in the Grand Theft Auto video game series
- Lance Wilkinson, in the Australian soap opera Neighbours

== See also ==
- Lance (surname)
- Lance (disambiguation)
