= Lanz Bulldog D 9506 =

Lanz Bulldog D 9606
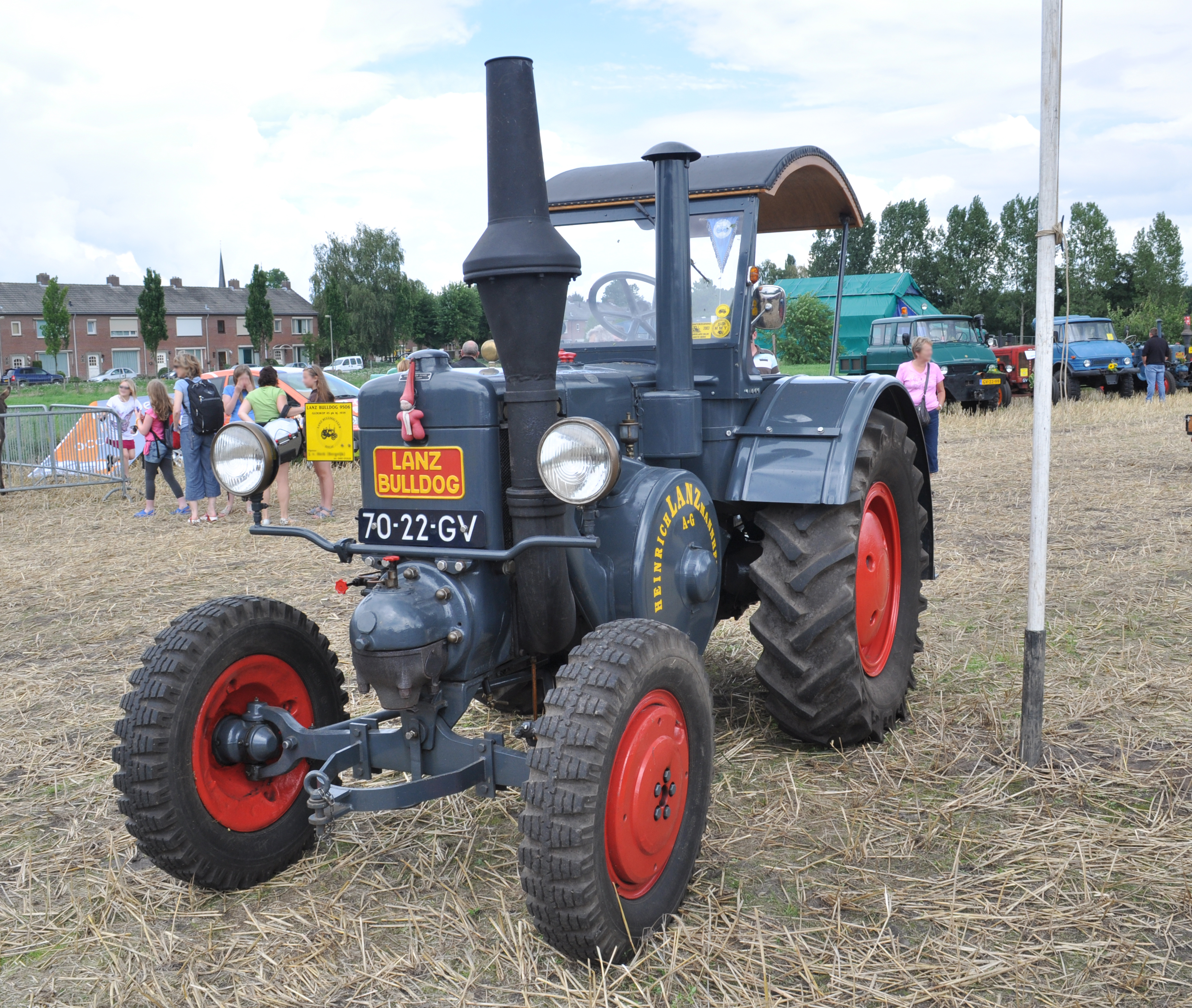
- Lanz Bulldog D 9506

Overview
- Type: Tractor
- Manufacturer: Lanz Bulldog
- Also called: Ackerluft
- Production: 1934 – 1955
- Assembly: Mannheim

Body and chassis
- Related: Ursus C-45

Powertrain
- Engine: Hot-bulb, Inline one-cylinder, 10.3 L (28 kW)
- Transmission: 3-speed manual
- Propulsion: Tyres

Dimensions
- Wheelbase: 2036 mm
- Length: 3390 mm
- Width: 1792 mm
- Height: 2185 mm
- Kerb weight: 3950 kg

Chronology
- Predecessor: HR 7 series D 8506
- Successor: None

The Lanz Bulldog D 9506 is a tractor of the HR 8 series, produced by Heinrich Lanz AG in Mannheim from 1934 to 1955, with a production stop in 1945. In total, 3817 units were produced. The tractor was sold under the brand name Ackerluft (field-air). The Ursus C-45, produced in Poland from 1947 to 1959, was a copy of the D 9506.

== Description ==
The D 9506 utilises a frameless block construction. It has a rear live axle and a dead front beam axle. The front axle was available with optional leaf springs. The tractor has air filled tyres. The D 9506 does not have a lockable differential. The gearbox is a manual 3-speed Lanz gearbox with a reverse gear, and an additional range, this makes 6 forward gears and 2 reverse gears. The minimum speed is 3,3 km/h in first gear, maximum speed is 16,7 km/h in sixth gear. The drum brakes at the rear wheels are foot-operated, the handbrake locks the gearbox.

The standard Lanz hot-bulb engine with a displacement of 10.3 L was used, it has a thermosiphon cooler. Compared to the predecessor series HR 6 and HR 7, the engine now has a better speed governor, the rated engine speed was increased from 540 min^{−1} to 630 min^{−1}. Many sorts of diesel oil can be used as fuel. The D 9506 has an electrical system. If a starter motor is used, the lead-battery has a capacity of 94 Ah, without a starter motor the capacity is 75 Ah. The Lanz factory offered additional accessories, such as a cab or fenders.

=== Technical data ===
	D 9506
Production	1934–1944; 1945–1955
Engine characteristics	One-cylinder, two-stroke, hot-bulb akroyd engine, no valves, no carburettor; thermosiphon cooling system
Fuel	Fuel oil, Diesel fuel, Kerosene, Biodiesel
Fuel injection pressure and injection time	80 bar, crank angle 135°
Bore × Stroke, Displacement	225 mm × 260 mm, 10.338 dm³
Compression ratio	5:1
Rated power at 630 min^{−1}	28 kW
Maximum power for an hour at 630 min^{−1}	33 kW
Torque at 630 min^{−1}	500 N·m
Gearbox	3-speed manual with two ranges (6 forward, 2 reverse gears)
Propulsion	Tyres
Maximum speed	16.7 km/h
Fuel consumption	326 g/kWh
Fuel tank capacity	90 L
Electrical power system	Lead-acid battery, 12 V / 94 Ah
