= Cantz =

Cantz is a surname. Notable people with the surname include:

- Bart Cantz (1860–1943), American baseball player
- Guido Cantz (born 1971), German television presenter

== See also ==
- Lantz (surname)
