= Lanz (surname) =

Lanz is the surname of the following people:

- Albrecht Lanz (1898–1942), German military commander
- Alfred Lanz (1847–1907), Swiss painter and sculptor
- Anni Lanz (born 1945), Swiss human rights activist
- Austin William Lanz (1994–2021), American killer and perpetrator of 2021 Pentagon knife attack
- Christoph Lanz (born 1959), German TV personality
- David Lanz (born 1950), American musician
- Esther Lanz, American politician
- Heinrich Lanz (1838–1905), German entrepreneur and engineer
- Hubert Lanz (1896–1982), German military commander
- Jörg Lanz von Liebenfels (1874–1954), Austrian monk and right-winged publisher of racial theories
- José María Lanz (1764–1839), Spanish-Mexican mathematician and engineer
- Juan Lanz (born 1932), Mexican swimmer
- Laureano Vallenilla Lanz (1870–1936), Venezuelan philosopher
- Markus Lanz (born 1969), Italian news anchor (in Germany)
- Mateo Sanz Lanz (born 1993), Swiss sailor
- Monica Lanz (born 1991), Dutch rower
- Otto Lanz (1865–1935), Swiss surgeon
- Paula Lanz Blazquez (born 1996), Spanish racing cyclist
- Pedro Luis Díaz Lanz (1926–2008), Chief of the Revolutionary Air Force of Cuba
- Rick Lanz (born 1961), Czech-Canadian hockey player
- Víctor Manuel Méndez Lanz (born 1952), Mexican politician

== See also ==
- Lantz (surname)
- Lance (surname)
- Lanz Pierce (born 1989), American rapper, singer, songwriter and producer
