= Lancer (disambiguation) =

A lancer is a cavalry soldier who fights with a lance.

Lancer may also refer to:

== Military ==
- Rockwell B-1 Lancer, a strategic bomber used by the United States Air Force
- Lockheed CL-1200 Lancer, a late-1960s proposed update to the F-104 Starfighter
- Republic P-43 Lancer, a single-engine fighter first delivered to the United States Army Air Corps in 1940
- Sperry Lancer, an American surface-to-air missile system that never reached production; see FIM-43 Redeye
- Mikoyan-Gurevich MiG-21 Lancer, a variant of the MiG-21 made for the Romanian Air Force
- HAL Lancer, a variant of the Aérospatiale SA 315B Lama helicopter
- The nickname for VMFA-212, U.S. Marine Fighter Attack Squadron 212
- Lancer Barracks, a historic military facility and grounds in Parramatta, New South Wales, Australia
- Operation Lancer, a 1942 Dutch and Australian World War II operation on Timor

== Transportation ==
- Austin Lancer, a passenger car produced by the British Motor Corporation of Australia between 1958 and 1964
- Dodge Lancer, a car produced from 1955 to 1962 and 1985–1989
  - Shelby Lancer, a limited-production hatchback sports sedan based on the Dodge Lancer
- Mitsubishi Lancer, a car produced since 1973
- Type C7 ship (Lancer class), a designation for a cargo ship and the first purpose-built container ship
- Champion Lancer, a twin-engine training plane produced in 1963 by Champion Aircraft

== Sports ==
- Omaha Lancers, a United States Hockey League franchise
- Longwood Lancers, the sports teams of Longwood University in Farmville, Virginia
- Rochester Lancers (disambiguation), several soccer teams in Rochester, New York
- UV Green Lancers, the sports teams of the University of the Visayas in Cebu City, Philippines
- Windsor Lancers, the sports teams of the University of Windsor in Ontario, Canada
- California Baptist Lancers, the sports teams of California Baptist University

The athletics teams of numerous high schools are named Lancers:

- Lasalle Secondary School in Greater Sudbury, Ontario, Canada
- Lakenheath High School on the American base at RAF Lakenheath in England
- Salpointe Catholic High School in Tucson, Arizona
- In California:
  - Lakeside High School (Lake Elsinore, California)
  - La Serna High School in Whittier
  - Sunny Hills High School in Fullerton
  - East Union High School in Manteca
  - Carlsbad High School (Carlsbad, California)
  - Hilltop High School in Chula Vista
  - Saint Francis High School (Mountain View)
- Waterford High School (Connecticut) in Waterford, Connecticut
- Shawnee Mission East High School in Prairie Village, Kansas
- Linganore High School in Frederick, Maryland
- Livingston High School (Livingston, New Jersey)
- Lewiston-Porter High School, in the Lewiston-Porter Central School District, Youngstown, New York
- Longmeadow High School in Longmeadow, Massachusetts
- Malden Catholic High School in Malden, Massachusetts
- Manchester High School in Midlothian, Virginia
- La Salle High School (Cincinnati, Ohio)
- General McLane High School in Edinboro, Pennsylvania
- Loyalsock Township High School in Pennsylvania
- John R. Lewis High School, Springfield, Virginia
- South Umpqua High School in Myrtle Creek, Oregon
- Lawrence High School (Massachusetts) in Lawrence, Massachusetts

== Entertainment ==
- Lancer (TV series), a 1969 western series
- One of the supporting characters in Fate/stay night, an adult Japanese visual novel
- A gargantuan robot featured in the video game Sonic Unleashed, called the Egg Lancer
- The nickname for Lance Belmont, a character from the fictional Robotech Universe
- The surname of Mr. Lancer, a teacher from the Danny Phantom universe
- Lancer, a major character from the video game Deltarune
- A character in the television series My Little Pony Tales
- Lancer Assault Rifle, a weapon in the video game Gears of War featuring a chainsaw bayonet
- A weapon in the video game Ratchet & Clank: Going Commando, one of the game's starting weapons
- A fictional university in the television series Hellcats
- A nickname for hunters who primarily use the "Lance" class weapon in the video game Monster Hunter
- "Lancer", a 2018 track by Toby Fox from Deltarune Chapter 1 OST from the video game Deltarune
- Lancer (role-playing game), a tabletop mech RPG

== Other ==
- Lancer, Saskatchewan, a small village in Canada
- The U.S. Secret Service codename for President John F. Kennedy
- Lancers (wine brand), a brand of sparkling wine from Portugal
- Lancer Books, a publishing house
- Lethrinus genivittatus, a species of fish in the genus Lethrinus commonly called the lancer

== See also ==
- Les Lanciers or The Lancers, a form of dance
- Lancero (English: Lancer), a Colombian National Army training course
