= Lancet =

Lancet most commonly refers to The Lancet, a medical journal.

It may also refer to:

== Medicine ==
- Lancet (surgery), a cutting instrument with a double-edged blade and a pointed end for making small incisions or drainage punctures.
- Blood lancet, a pricking needle used to obtain drops of blood for testing

== Architecture ==
- Lancet arch, a narrow, tall opening with a pointed arch
- Lancet window, a window set in a lancet arch

== People ==
- Doron Lancet, Israeli geneticist

== Other uses ==
- Dennis Lancet, a bus chassis
- LG Lancet, a Windows smartphone
- ZALA Lancet, a Russian military drone

== See also ==
- Lancelet, an animal
- Lancetfish, an animal
- Lance (disambiguation)
