= Leo Ford =

American pornographic actor (1957–1991)

- Born: Leo John Hilgeford; July 5, 1957; Dayton, Ohio, U.S.
- Died: July 17, 1991 (aged 34); Los Angeles, California, U.S.
- Occupations: Pornographic actor; model
- Partner(s): Divine, Craig Markle

Leo Ford (born Leo John Hilgeford; July 5, 1957 – July 17, 1991) was an American pornographic actor who appeared in gay pornographic films and bisexual pornographic movies and magazines in the 1980s. He was born in Dayton, Ohio.

== Career ==
In 1989, Ford was crowned King of the Beaux Arts Ball in New York City. His Queen was Melissa Slade.

Ford paired with David Alan Reis a.k.a. "Lance" in Leo & Lance and Blonds Do It Best, Leo and Lance directed by William Higgins; Blonds Do It Best directed by Richard Morgan. In his starring role for the film Games, directed by Steve Scott, Ford played a medal-winning swimmer in the Gay Games competition, with Al Parker playing a photographer assigned to take professional portraits of the athlete. In a scene that foreshadowed what happened to Ford in real life, his character had a severe motorcycle accident that left him hospitalized and in a coma.

Ford died in 1991 two days after a motorcycle accident, from a major brain trauma, after being hit by a car while riding his motorcycle near Sunset Boulevard. His partner of 6 years, Craig Markle, survived with minor injuries.

== Personal life ==
Ford had a short-lived relationship with cult actor Divine. The two travelled together and he made appearances at clubs in which Divine was contracted to perform. In late 1985, Ford began a relationship with Craig Markle. Ford and Markle lived together in Los Angeles and Hawaii, where they raised tropical birds and ran a tour and recreation business called "Pacific Paradise Tours".

== Selected videography ==
=== Gay ===
- Best of Leo Ford
- Blondes Do It Best (1986)
- Colossal Cocks 5
- Flashbacks (J. Brian) (1980)
- Games (1983)
- Leo & Lance (1983)
- New York City Pro (1982)
- A Night at Alfies
- Sailor in the Wild (1983)
- Sex in the Great Outdoors (1980–1984)
- Spokes (1983)
- Stiff Sentence (1986)
- Style (1982)
- William Higgins Class Reunion (1983)
- Summer Of Scott Noll (1981)

=== Bisexual ===
- Best Bi Far #1
- Passion by Fire: The Big Switch 2
- True Crimes of Passion

== See also ==
- List of pornographic movie studios
- List of male performers in gay porn films
