= Fritz Huber (engineer) =

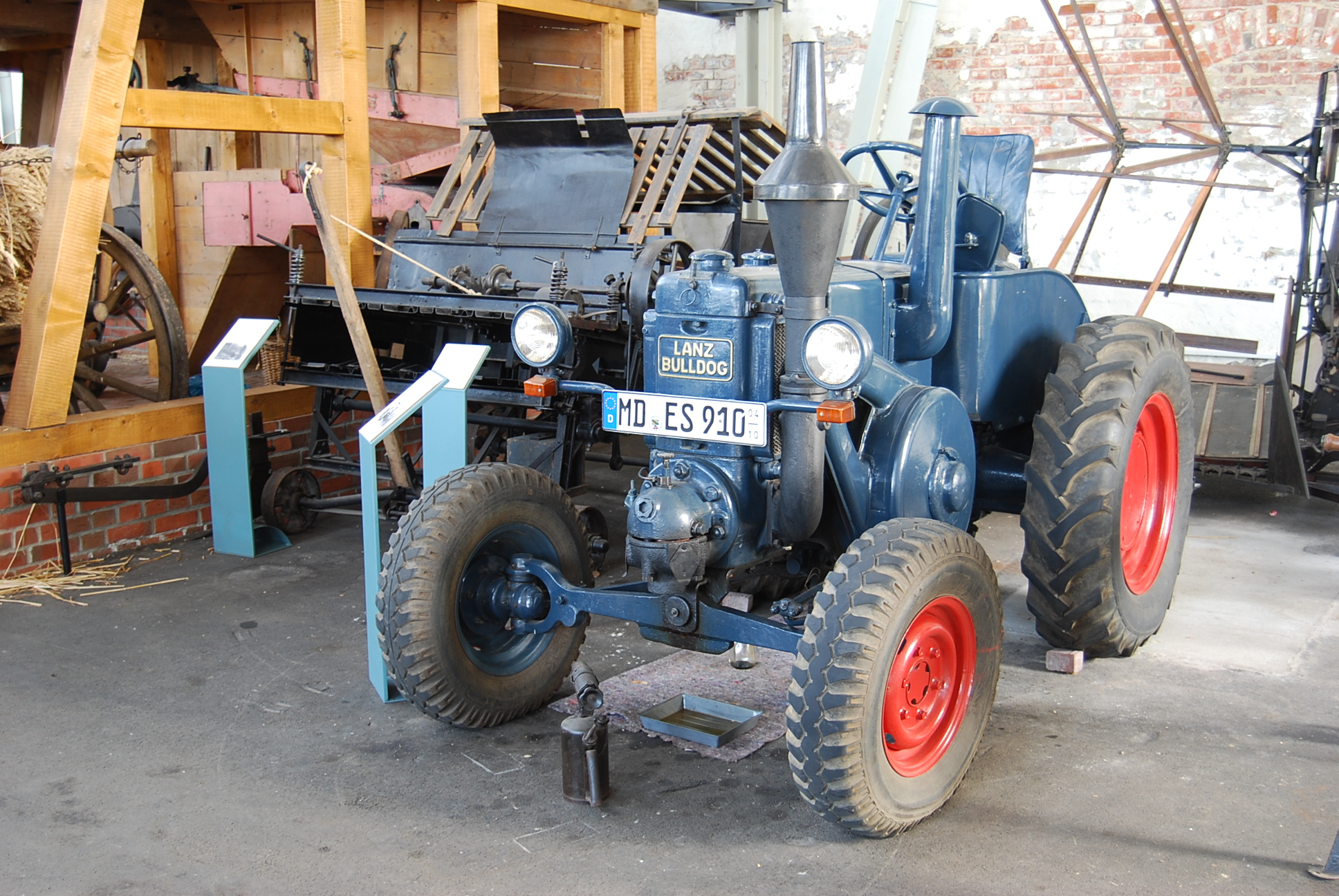
Lanz Bulldog tractor

Fritz Huber (1881–1942) was a German mechanical engineer and designer of the Lanz Bulldog tractor.

== Biography ==
Huber was born on 8 March 1881 in Wasserburg am Inn. He came from an old family of engineers. In Munich, he first attended the industrial school, then he began studying at the local technical college. He successfully completed his studies in 1903 and went on to work in France and Switzerland. After his return to Germany, he got a job at the Grade company in Magdeburg, where he devoted himself to the construction of high-quality two-stroke engines. He also built the first hot-bulb engines at the Climax plant in Vienna and improved their running characteristics with adjustable injectors and improved mass balance. On 20 September 1916, he obtained employment with Heinrich Lanz AG in Mannheim. He constructed gasoline-powered tractors for the German army in the First World War. Between 1918 and 1921, he developed a single-cylinder hot-bulb engine for stationary work. This engine was later used in the Lanz Bulldog, the first German heavy-oil tractor in mass production. Because of the First World War, the testing of the concept had to be postponed but, from 1920, the development and construction of the Bulldog got underway. The tractor got its name because of its external resemblance to a bulldog and Fritz Huber is considered the "Father of the Bulldogs". In 1942, Huber retired because of illness. He died on 14 April 1942 in Mannheim.
