= Lancing =

Lancing may refer to:

- Lancing (surgical procedure), a minor surgical procedure to release pus or pressure built up under the skin
- Lancing (shearing), a manufacturing procedure involving a workpiece sheared and bent with one strike of a die
- Lancing, West Sussex, England, a village in West Sussex between Worthing and Shoreham-by-Sea
- Lancing (electoral division), a West Sussex County Council constituency
- Lancing College, an English public school
- Lancing railway station, a British railway station operated by Southern on the West Coastway line
- Lancing Carriage Works, a defunct railway site in the village of Lancing, West Sussex

== See also ==
- Lance (disambiguation)
- Lansing (disambiguation)
