= Lantz Farm and Nature Preserve Wildlife Management Area =

State Wildlife Management Area in Wetzel County, West Virginia

- IUCN category V (protected landscape/seascape)
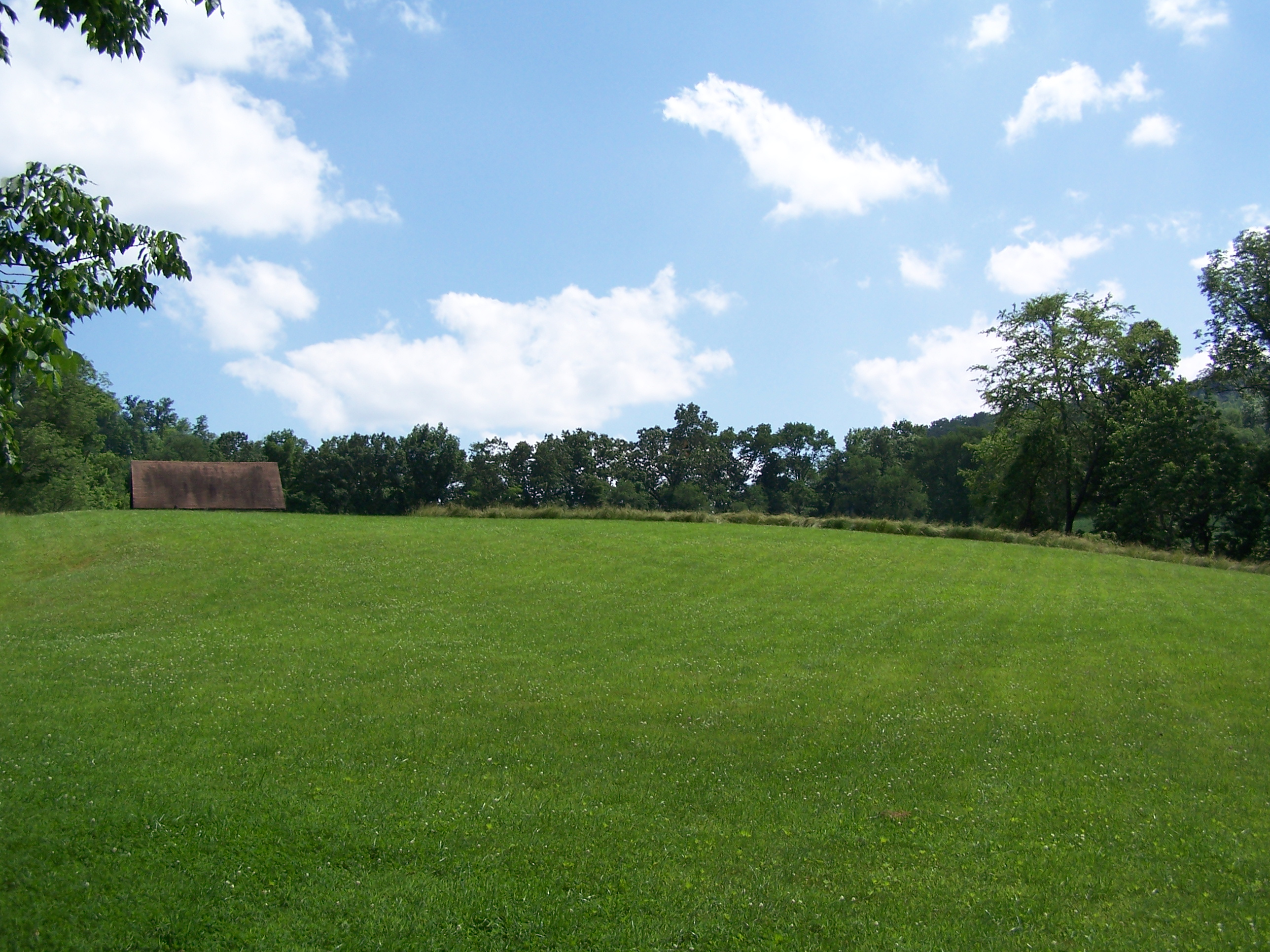
- Lantz Farm

- Location within West Virginia
- Location: Jacksonburg, Wetzel, West Virginia, United States
- Coordinates: 39°31′57″N 80°38′53″W
- Area: 555 acres (225 ha)
- Elevation: 741 ft (226 m)
- Operator: West Virginia Division of Natural Resources, Wildlife Resources Section
- Website: WVDNR District 1 Wildlife Management Areas

The Lantz Farm and Nature Preserve Wildlife Management Area is located on 555 acres (225 ha) in Jacksonburg, east of Blacksville in Wetzel County, West Virginia. Part of the site is operated as a retreat for the farm's owner, Wheeling University.
