= Lansing (disambiguation) =

Lansing is the capital of the U.S. state of Michigan.

Lansing may also refer to:

== Places ==
=== United States ===
- Lansing, Florida, an unincorporated community
- Lansing, Illinois, a village
- Lansing, Iowa, a city in Lansing Township
- Lansing, Kansas, a city
- Lansing, New York, a town
  - Lansing (village), New York, a village in the town
- Lansing, North Carolina, a town
- Lansing, Ohio, an unincorporated community
- Lansing, Salem, Oregon, a neighborhood of Salem
- Lansing, West Virginia, an unincorporated community
- Lansing Township, Allamakee County, Iowa
- Lansing Township, Mower County, Minnesota
- Lansing, Michigan the capital of Michigan
- Lansing Charter Township, Michigan
- Lake Lansing, Michigan
- Roman Catholic Diocese of Lansing, Michigan

=== Canada ===
- Lansing, Toronto, Ontario, a neighbourhood
- former name of Willowdale, Toronto

== Other uses ==
- Lansing (name)
- USS Lansing (DE-388), a U.S. Navy destroyer escort named after William Henry Lansing
- Altec Lansing, a line of audio products
- Lansing Bagnall, British former forklift manufacturer
- Lansing Oldsmobile, an American football team (1919–1920, returned in 1922 as the Durants, 1922–1923)

== See also ==
- Lansing Man, prehistoric human remains found near Lansing, Kansas
- Lancing (disambiguation)
