= Lanz Bulldog =

Tractors made by Heinrich Lanz in Germany

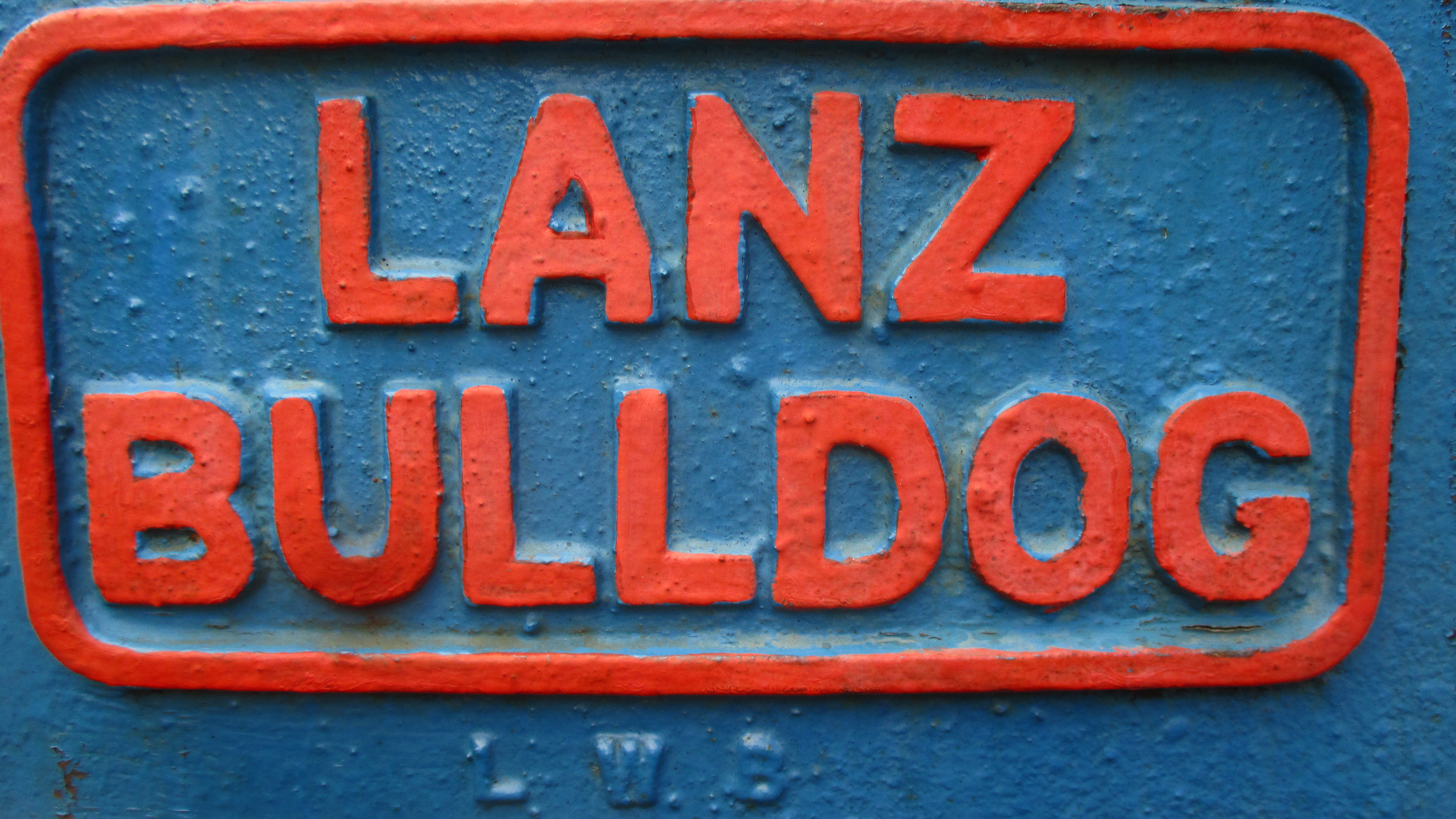
Lanz Bulldog - Sign

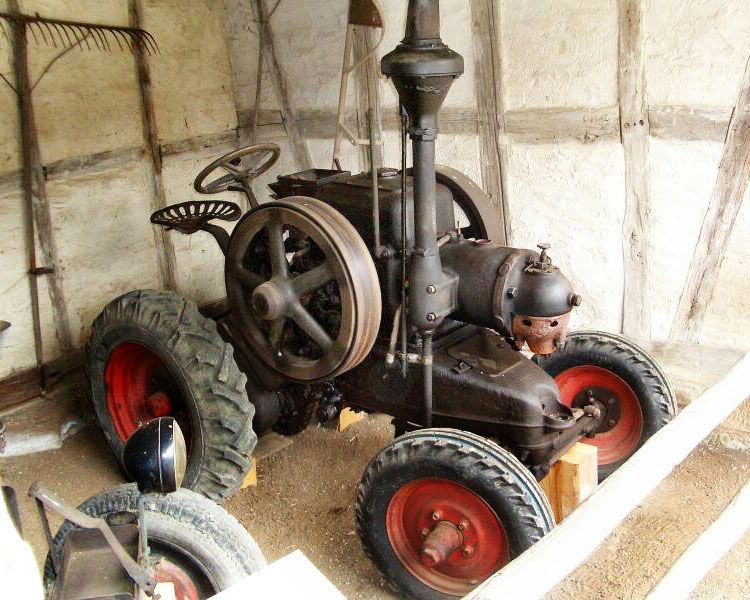
A 1928 Lanz Bulldog showing the hot bulb engine

The Lanz Bulldog was a series of tractors manufactured by Heinrich Lanz AG in Mannheim, Baden-Württemberg, Germany. Production started in 1921 with the Lanz HL, and various versions of the Bulldog were produced up to 1960, one of them being the Lanz Bulldog D 9506. John Deere purchased Lanz in 1956 and started using the name "John Deere Lanz" for the Lanz product line. A few years after the Bulldog was discontinued, the Lanz name fell into disuse. The Lanz Bulldog was one of the most popular German tractors, with over 220,000 of them produced in its long production life. The name "Bulldog" became the general term for tractors in some German regions, most notably in Bavaria.

== Engine ==
Scheme of an Akroyd engine: 1 – hot-bulb ignition device, 2 – cylinder, 3 – piston, 4 – crankcase; the unlabelled part on the left is the exhaust

The Lanz Bulldog was built with a single-cylinder, two-stroke, Akroyd engine – the so-called Bulldog engine – that was designed by Fritz Huber. The Bulldog engine was installed horizontally, with the ignition device – the hot bulb – facing forward. It has crankcase scavenging and intake ports instead of valves. Due to its few moving parts – the piston, crank assembly, and flywheel, the fuel-injection system and oil system are the only parts that move – it was simple to manufacture, operate, and maintain. In the Bulldog engine, fuel is sprayed under low pressure onto the hot-bulb ignition device, where the fuel is ignited and gradually undergoes combustion. This makes the Bulldog engine thermodynamically inefficient, but it requires neither a carburettor like an Otto engine nor high compression of a diesel engine. It does not require a special fuel to operate; it can burn regular fuels such as diesel fuel or petrol, but also a wide variety of low-grade fuel oils – even waste oils. This made the Bulldog engine reasonably economical to operate, despite its high fuel consumption. The original Bulldog had evaporative cooling. Later models used a thermosiphon cooler. For starting, the ignition device has to be heated to ignition temperature using a blow torch, then the engine is hand-cranked with the steering wheel (removed from its usual place and attached to the end of the crankshaft). Late Bulldog engines have a redesigned hot bulb with direct injection; they were offered with electric glowplugs and an electric starter motor. Lanz sold these as Halbdiesel (half diesel) and Volldiesel (full diesel) models, although the engine was not a diesel engine. The Bulldog engine was made with various different displacements, with the 4.8- and 10.3-litre versions being the most common ones.

- 130 mm × 170 mm, 2256 cm³
- 140 mm × 170 mm, 2617 cm³
- 145 mm × 170 mm, 2807 cm³
- 150 mm × 210 mm, 3711 cm³
- 160 mm × 190 mm, 3820 cm³
- 160 mm × 210 mm, 4222 cm³
- 170 mm × 210 mm, 4767 cm³
- 190 mm × 220 mm, 6238 cm³
- 210 mm × 210 mm, 7274 cm³
- 190 mm × 260 mm, 7372 cm³
- 225 mm × 260 mm, 10338 cm³

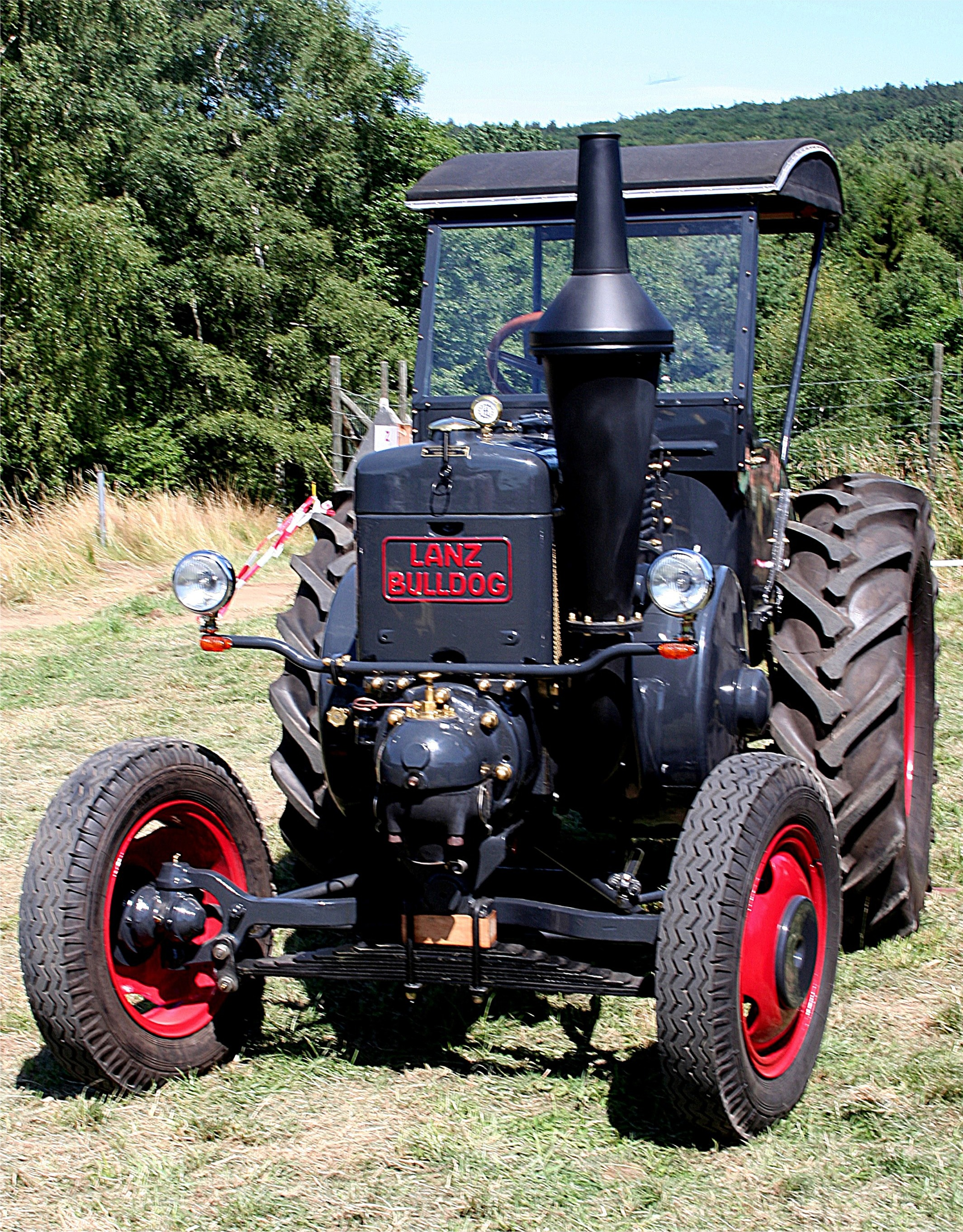
A 1939 model of Lanz Bulldog 8506, still built around a hot-bulb engine

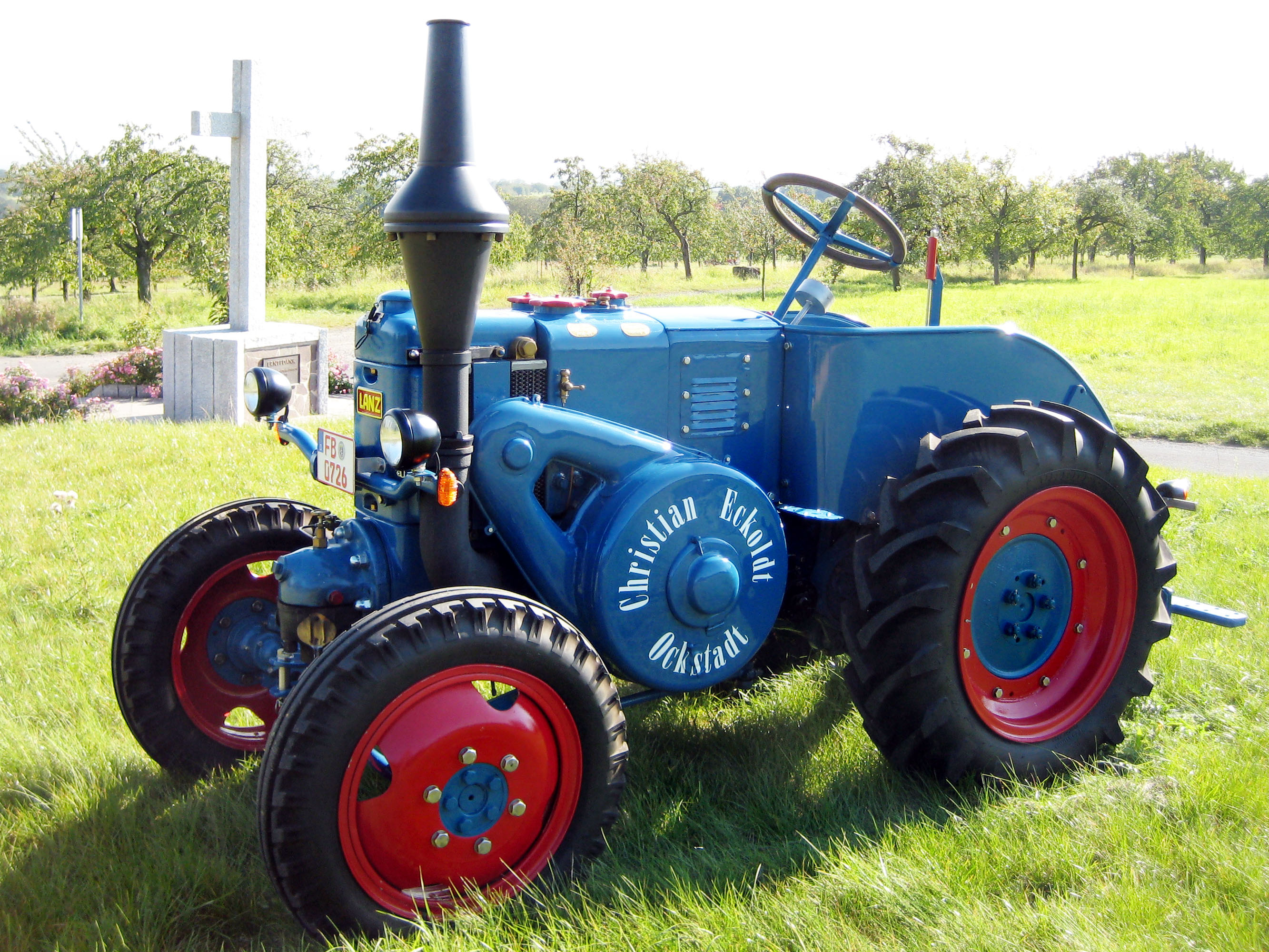
A 1939 model of Lanz Bulldog D7506/3

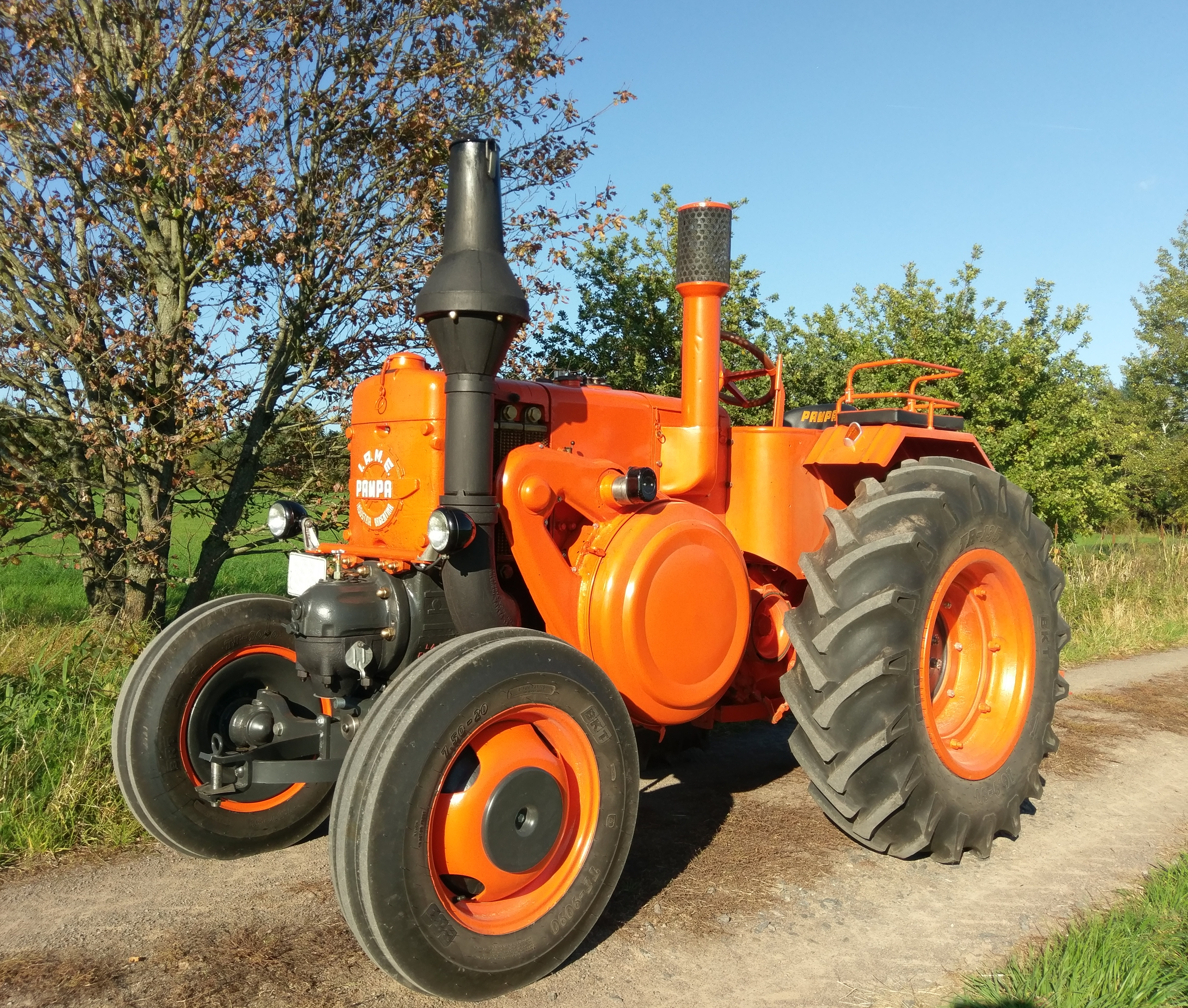
Model T01 from IAME made in Argentina

== Lanz Iberica ==
Bulldogs were also produced in Spain by Lanz Iberica S.A. at Getafe near Madrid. A total of 17,100 tractors were built from 1956 to 1963.

== Lanz Alldog ==
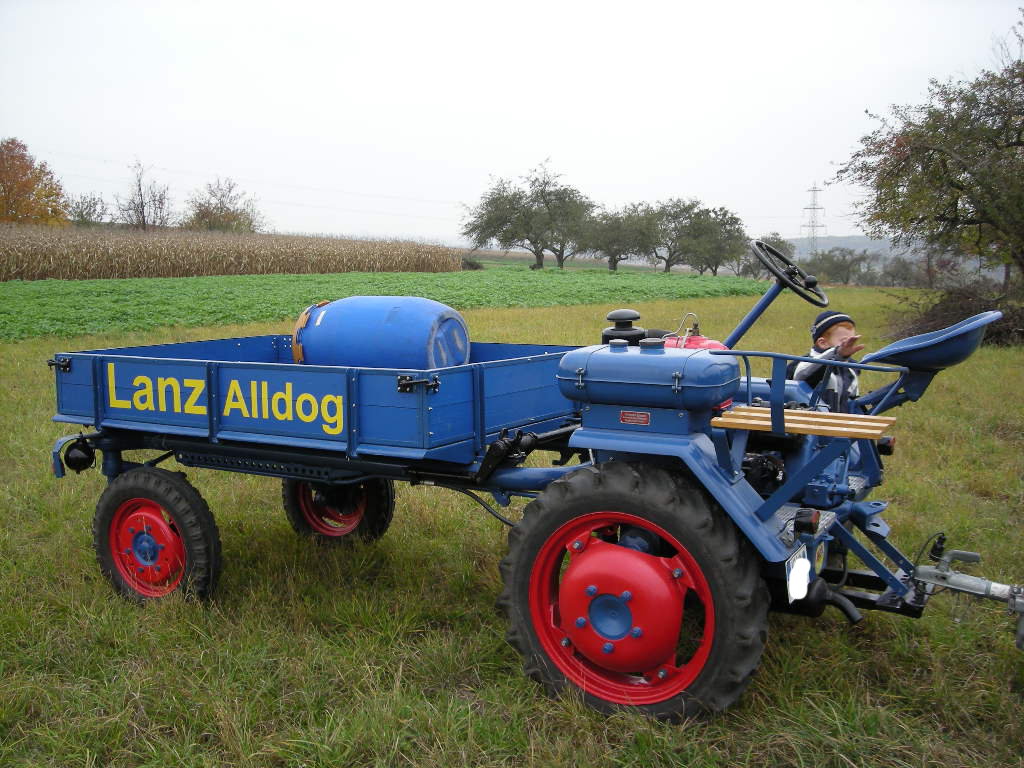
Lanz AllDog

From 1951-57, Lanz manufactured a rear-engined derivative of the Bulldog, known as the Lanz Alldog. This had a large bed over the front wheels, for transporting cargo over ground unsuitable for a trailer. Tractors of this type were popular among Israeli farmers during the 1950s, especially on hilly and mountainous terrain.

== Bulldog copies ==
The Bulldog design was copied in other countries by several different manufacturers. While some of these copies were legitimately produced under license from Bulldog, most of them were built with each respective builder's own frame and body design, being powered by unlicensed copies of the patented Bulldog hot-bulb engine. Some of these examples are:

=== France ===
Le Percheron was a licensed copy of the 25 HP hot-bulb Bulldog built by Société Nationale de Construction Aeronautic du Centre (SNCAC) at Colombe in France from about 1939. Nearly 3,700 are believed to have been built before production ceased in 1956.

=== Australia ===
The KL Bulldog was produced by Kelly & Lewis of Springvale, Victoria, Australia, from 1948 to December 1952. Just over 860 were built, based on the 35 HP Model N Bulldog.

=== Poland ===
Ursus produced a copy of the 45 HP Bulldog at the ZM Ursus factory (Zakłady Mechanicze Ursus) in Poland in Ursus near Warsaw from 1947, called the C-45. It was replaced by the C-451 in 1957, and from 1960, the production was moved to Zakłady Mechaniczne in Gorzów Wielkopolski. About 55,000 Ursus C-45s and C-451s were built from 1947 until 1965.

=== Argentina ===
In 1951, a copy of the 55 HP Bulldog was produced by Industrias Aeronáuticas y Mecánicas del Estado in Argentina. The tractor was called "Pampa" and the badge on the front read IAME. From 1955, the tractor was produced by Dirección Nacional de Fabricaciones e Investigaciones Aeronáuticas and the badge was changed to DINFIA. In total, 3,760 Pampas were produced from 1951 to 1960.

== Similar tractors ==
The Bulldog was similar to other European hot-bulb tractors that were being produced around the same time. Some of these examples are the SF Vierzon from France, the Landini tractor from Italy, and the HSCS from Hungary. The Field Marshall that was produced in England was a similar design to the Bulldog hot-bulb engine with the exception of an internally designed vaporing plate that replaced the conventional, externally located hot-bulb, this internal design required ignition papers in place of the external glow lamp to start the engine.
