= Lantz (given name) =

Lantz is a given name. Notable people with the name include:

- Lantz Lamback (born 1986), American swimmer
- Lantz L'Amour (born 1978), American musician

== See also ==
- Lantz (surname)
