= Heinrich Lanz =

German engineer

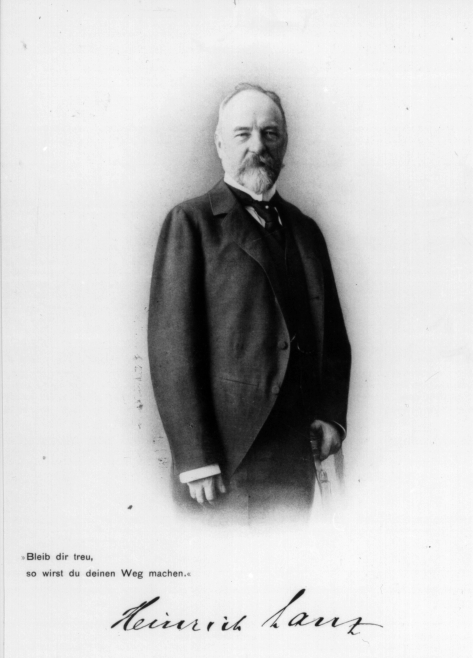
- Born: 9 March 1838; Friedrichshafen
- Died: 1 February 1905 (aged 66); Mannheim
- Occupation: Entrepreneur
- Spouse: Jula Faul (m. 1865)
- Children: four

Heinrich Lanz (9 March 1838 in Friedrichshafen – 1 February 1905 in Mannheim) was a German entrepreneur and engineer. He founded Heinrich Lanz AG, a manufacturer of agricultural machinery and stationary steam engines and locomotives exported globally.

== Life ==
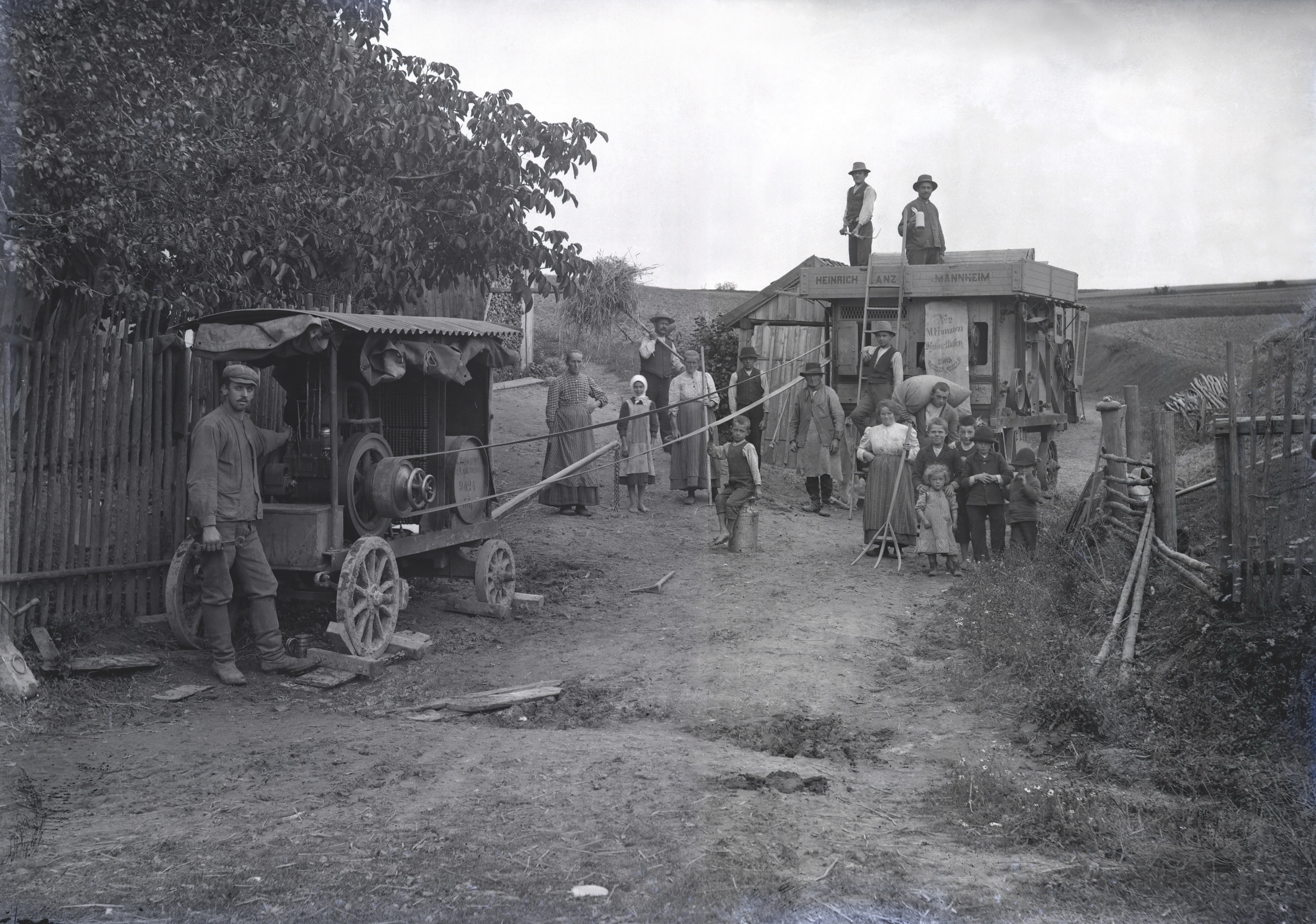
Dreschmaschine by Heinrich Lanz, 1909

Heinrich Lanz was born in Friedrichshafen on 9 March 1838, the fourth of seven children of shipping magnate Johann Peter Lanz and Luise Christiane Beckh. He attended primary school in his native Friedrichshafen, secondary school in Biberach an der Riss, and then got apprenticed at a grocery store in Mannheim and enrolled at a trade school in Stuttgart. Following this, he entered his father's business, preparing agricultural fertilizer and machinery for export to England.

In 1859, Heinrich Lanz founded Heinrich Lanz AG in Mannheim. In 1865, he married Jula Faul and had four children with her.
