= Rochester Lancers =

Rochester Lancers may refer to:

- Rochester Lancers (2015), a semi-professional soccer team that competes in the National Premier Soccer League
- Rochester Lancers (MASL), a defunct indoor soccer team that competed in the Major Arena Soccer League 2 from 2014-2024.
- Rochester Lady Lancers, a women's soccer team that competes in the United Women's Soccer League since 2017
- Rochester Lancers (1967–1980), a defunct soccer team that played in the American Soccer League (1967–1969) and the North American Soccer League (1970–1980)
