= Jacksonburg, West Virginia =

Jacksonburg
- Census-designated place (CDP)
- Location within the state of West Virginia
- Coordinates: 39°31′56″N 80°38′30″W
- Country: United States
- State: West Virginia
- County: Wetzel

Area
  - Total: 1.501 sq mi (3.89 km^{2})
  - Land: 1.481 sq mi (3.84 km^{2})
  - Water: 0.020 sq mi (0.052 km^{2})

Population (2020)
  - Total: 114
  - Density: 77.0/sq mi (29.7/km^{2})
- Time zone: UTC-5 (Eastern (EST))
  - Summer (DST): UTC-4 (EDT)

Jacksonburg is a census-designated place (CDP) in Wetzel County, West Virginia, United States. It lies at an elevation of 748 feet (228 m). As of the 2020 census, its population was 114 (down from 182 at the 2010 census).
