= Operation Lancer =

Military operation by Dutch and Australian troops on Timor during World War II

- Part of South West Pacific theatre of World War II
Date	1942
Location	Timor

Belligerents
Netherlands; Australia	Empire of Japan

Strength
60	Unknown

Casualties and losses
Unknown	Unknown

Operation Lancer was a military operation by Dutch and Australian troops on Timor during World War II. Lancer Force was the name of Australian troops used to replace Sparrow Force.

Around 60 men from the KNIL were to be inserted onto Timor by the Australian navy to undertake guerrilla warfare against the Japanese. Australian ships were constantly attacked by Japanese planes and on 1 December 1942 HMAS Armidale was sunk with heavy loss of life; most of the survivors died.
