= Lance (actor) =

American adult film actor and model (1962–1991)

- Born: David Alan Reis; November 25, 1962; Santa Barbara, California, U.S.
- Died: May 26, 1991 (aged 28); San Jose, California, U.S.
- Other name: David Reis
- Education: Capuchino High School
- Occupations: Actor; Model
- Years active: 1982–1991
- Agent(s): Malibu Studios; Falcon Studios

David Alan Reis (November 25, 1962 – May 26, 1991), known professionally by the mononym Lance, was an American adult film actor and sex worker who became one of the most prominent and recognizable figures in gay adult cinema during the 1980s. Celebrated for his distinct platinum-blond hair, athletic physique, and uncircumcised aesthetic, his active career spanned from 1982 to 1988. He is best remembered for his iconic on-screen chemistry and off-screen partnership with fellow adult star Leo Ford.

== Early life and education ==
David Alan Reis was born on November 25, 1962 in Santa Barbara, California. He was the son of Dennis Nicholas Reis Jr. Reis's upbringing was highly unstable and marked by deep systemic dysfunction. He grew up primarily within the California foster care system and later recounted that his childhood biological and foster environments were heavily plagued by domestic violence. He attended Capuchino High School in San Bruno, California, a municipality located immediately south of San Francisco. During his adolescence and early adulthood, Reis lived transiently on and off in San Francisco, navigating the city's street cultures.

He frequently ran afoul of law enforcement, accumulating numerous juvenile and adult arrests. In a candid 1986 interview, Reis admitted that the volatility of his youth heavily carried into his adult behavior, acknowledging that he struggled with a recurring pattern of getting heavily intoxicated and instigating severe physical altercations with others.

== Career ==
=== Discovery and breakthrough (1982–1983) ===
Reis was discovered and groomed for the adult entertainment industry in 1982 by Malibu Studios. Performing under the single stage name Lance, he immediately garnered attention for his sun-kissed, all-American California look, athletic build, and a vibrant, "perennial smile" that telegraphed an unforced enthusiasm on camera. Adult film historians and critics note that Lance represented a notable cultural shift in the industry; he was one of the first major American performers to perform openly uncircumcised, challenging and subsequently shifting the contemporary aesthetic preferences of American adult cinema.

Lance's definitive career breakthrough occurred in an early loop scene titled Hilltop Retreat (later integrated into the feature-length film Good Times Coming). Performing alongside a performer named "Mark," Lance drew the immediate attention of prominent director William Higgins due to his improvisational instincts, effectively taking center stage by breaking standard scene conventions. Recognizing his raw screen presence, Higgins chose to pair Lance with another rapidly rising star of the era, Leo Ford. Ford was already highly regarded in the industry following major 1981–1983 releases such as Flashbacks, The Summer of Scott Noll, Spokes, Games, and Sailor in the Wild.

=== Rise to prominence and industry rivalries ===
The pairing of Lance and Leo Ford resulted in immediate and massive commercial success. Their first major feature together was Higgins's 1983 blockbuster Leo & Lance: The Good Times Are Here (often referred to simply as Leo & Lance), where Lance performed as the insertive partner to Ford. The film's promotional poster—a minimalist, striking photograph of the duo—became iconic within the subculture.

The production of Leo & Lance became the flashpoint of a notorious industry feud. At the time, Lance was romantically and professionally involved with rival producer and director Richard Morgan. Lance told Morgan he was stepping out to buy coffee, only to disappear for hours to secretly shoot the feature for Higgins. Because Higgins and Morgan were intense professional adversaries, the incident caused a massive, public rift between the two production camps.

Despite the backstage conflict, Lance's star power rose rapidly. In 1983 alone, he starred as a dominant performer in other major releases, including Student Bodies and Good Hot Stuff. His mainstream subculture visibility peaked in 1984 when he appeared live on stage at the historic Follies theater in New York City, headlining a high-profile revue alongside top adult stars Kip Noll and Daniel Holt.

The professional hostilities between Higgins and Morgan eventually cooled enough to capitalize on the financial viability of the performers. In 1985, Lance and Leo Ford reunited for the massive box-office hit Blonds Do It Best, directed by Richard Morgan. The film cemented their legacy as a definitive duo of the 1980s and featured a famous multi-performer climax involving Lance, Shawn Michaels, and Ty Cashe.

=== Late career and retirement ===
Throughout his tenure in adult cinema, Lance was known as a highly bankable star, but his off-screen life remained chaotic. Directors and peers noted he had a reputation for drinking to excess and creating disruptions on sets. Despite these difficulties, his baseline popularity was so immense that studios routinely salvaged unedited outtakes, releasing "new" scenes featuring Lance for years after his active filming periods ended.

His active career wound down toward the late 1980s as his health and personal struggles worsened. His final official screen appearance occurred in the 1988 film Backstrokes, in which he performed in a strictly solo, masturbation-only vignette.

== Personal life ==
Behind his public persona, Reis's lifestyle was deeply affected by severe chemical dependencies, including chronic alcoholism and intravenous drug use. To support himself outside of film residuals, Reis worked extensively within the independent escort and street sex work economies of San Francisco and Los Angeles. He and Leo Ford frequently operated as a team, leveraging their shared on-screen fame to secure high-paying private clients.

Reis's chaotic lifestyle was further illustrated by director William Higgins in a February 1991 interview with Manshots magazine. Higgins recalled Reis as "the baddest of the bad boys," recounting an incident where Reis was jailed following a severe, alcohol-related traffic accident. After calling Higgins frantically from jail in tears, Higgins posted his bail under the condition that Reis stay sober long enough to complete an upcoming film project. Instead, upon arriving at Higgins's residence, Reis reportedly insulted the director and walked out immediately, highlighting the volatile and precarious nature of industry relationships at the time.

== Death ==
Reis's history of intravenous drug use heavily exposed him to the expanding HIV/AIDS epidemic of the 1980s. He eventually contracted the virus and was diagnosed with clinical AIDS.

David died in San Jose, California, on May 26, 1991, from AIDS-related complications. He was 28 years old. Reflecting a common practice of adult performers hiding their industry ties on legal documentation during that era, his death certificate listed his legal occupation as a "model of clothing".

In a tragic coincidence that deeply shook the adult film community, his longtime co-star and friend Leo Ford died just 52 days later, on July 17, 1991, at the age of 34, after sustaining fatal head injuries in a motorcycle accident on Sunset Boulevard in Los Angeles.

Following his death, Reis's biological mother oversaw his final arrangements. He was cremated, and his ashes were scattered at sea off the coast of Marin County, California, just north of the San Francisco Bay Area where he spent his youth.

== Filmography ==
=== Film ===
Year	Title	Role	Notes
1982	Good Times Coming	Lance	Debut
1983	Good Hot Stuff	Lance	Produced by Buckshot
1983	Leo And Lance: The Good Times are Here	Lance	Produced by Catalina Video Distributors
1984	Big and Thick	Lance	Produced by HIS Video
1984	Peep Show	Lance	Produced by YMAC
1984	Solo Studs	Lance	
1984	Student Bodies	Student	
1985	Daniel Alan Loop Collection	Lance	Produced by Daniel Alan Films
1986	Blonds Do It Best	Lance	Nova Films
1987	Giant Splash Shots II: More Memories of Summer	Lance	Falcon Studios
1988	Backstrokes	Jeff White	Produced by Video 10
1988	Best of Leo Ford	Lance	Catalina Video Distributors
1988	Come Clean	Lance	Produced by LeSalon
1990	Catalina Orgies	Lance	
1991	Catalina Down and Dirty	Lance	
1992	Catalina Blonds	Lance	Catalina Video Distributors
1992	Leo Ford: The Making of a Superstar	Lance	Ford Entertainment
1997	LA Manhunt	Lance	Posthumous release
1998	Directors' Best William Higgins	Lance	Posthumous release
2002	Young Men of the 80's 2	Lance	Posthumous release
2003	Porn Authority	Lance	Posthumous release
2009	Face Fuckers 1	Lance	Posthumous release
2014	My Big Fucking Dick: Chad Douglas	Lance	Posthumous release
2020	Goodbye Seventies	Lance	Posthumous release
