= USS Lance =

Minesweeper of the United States Navy

History

United States
- Name: USS Lance (AM-257)
- Builder: American Ship Building Company
- Laid down: 26 October 1942
- Launched: 10 April 1943
- Commissioned: 4 November 1943
- Decommissioned: 28 August 1945
- Fate: Transferred to the Republic of China, 28 August 1945
- Stricken: 12 March 1948

History

Taiwan
- Name: ROCS Yung Sheng
- Acquired: 28 August 1945
- Decommissioned: 17 July 1972
- Fate: Unknown

General characteristics
- Class & type: Admirable-class minesweeper
- Displacement: 650 tons
- Length: 184 ft 6 in (56.24 m)
- Beam: 33 ft (10 m)
- Draft: 9 ft 9 in (2.97 m)
- Propulsion: 2 × ALCO 539 diesel engines, 1,710 shp (1.3 MW); Farrel-Birmingham single reduction gear; 2 shafts
- Speed: 14.8 knots (27.4 km/h)
- Complement: 104
- Armament: 1 × 3"/50 caliber gun DP; 2 × twin Bofors 40 mm guns; 1 × Hedgehog anti-submarine mortar; 2 × Depth charge tracks

Service record
- Part of: US Atlantic Fleet (1944-1946)

USS Lance (AM-257) was an Admirable-class minesweeper built for the U.S. Navy during World War II. She was built to clear minefields in offshore waters, and served the Navy in the Atlantic Ocean.

Lance was as laid down 26 October 1942 by American Shipbuilding Co., Cleveland, Ohio; launched 10 April 1943; sponsored by Ens. Josephine D. Cunningham, W-V (S) USNR; commissioned 4 November 1943.

== World War II North Atlantic operations ==
After shakedown along the U.S. East Coast, Lance arrived Trinidad, British West Indies, 17 January 1944 for patrol and escort duty. From January 1944 until March 1945, Lance operated as an escort for convoys, making nine regular runs from Recife, Brazil, to Trinidad. The minesweeper also engaged in ASW training with aircraft operations designed to improve the defensive capability of the Navy.

Lance departed Trinidad 23 March, and steamed toward Miami, Florida, arriving the 28th. She operated as a school ship, out of the Naval Training Center, Miami.

== Decommissioning ==
She was transferred to China, under the Lend-Lease Act on 28 August. She served the Chinese Navy under the name Yung Sheng. She was transferred outright on 7 February 1948, struck from the Naval Vessel Register on 12 March 1948, and decommissioned on 1 July 1972. Fate is unknown.
