= Lance Wilkinson (footballer) =

Australian rules footballer

Personal information
- Born: 14 March 1931
- Died: 12 April 2011 (aged 80)
- Original team: State Savings Bank
- Height: 170 cm (5 ft 7 in)
- Weight: 70 kg (154 lb)

Playing career^{1}
Years	Club	Games (Goals)
1949–1956	Hawthorn	116 (18)
- ^{1} Playing statistics correct to the end of 1956.

Lance Wilkinson (14 March 1931 – 12 April 2011) was an Australian rules footballer who played with Hawthorn in the Victorian Football League (VFL).

Wilkinson, originally from State Savings Bank in the Victorian Amateur Football Association, represented the Victorian Amateurs in 1948. A rover and wingman, Wilkinson joined Hawthorn in 1949 and would make 116 appearances for the club. In 1955 he represented Victoria in an interstate match against South Australia at Adelaide Oval. He went to Brighton in 1957.
