= Lance (surname) =

Lance is a surname. Notable people with the surname include:

- Albert Lance (1925–2013), Australian operatic tenor
- Bert Lance (1931–2013), American businessman, advisor to President Jimmy Carter
- Bryce Lance (born 2002), American football player
- Dean Lance (born 1959), Australian rugby league footballer and coach
- Donnie Cleveland Lance (1953–2020), American murderer
- Ernesto Lance (born 1949), Brazilian footballer
- Herb Lance (1925-2006), American singer, songwriter and radio DJ
- James Lance (born 1974), British actor
- James W. Lance (1926–2019), Australian neurologist
- Jim Lance (1931–2016), American football player and coach
- Leonard Lance (born 1952), American politician
- Major Lance (1939—1994), American soul singer
- Michael Lance, American politician
- Tiger Lance (1940–2010), South African cricketer
- Trey Lance (born 2000), American football player
- Wesley Lance (1908–2007), American politician

== Fictional characters ==
- Dinah Laurel Lance, also known as Black Canary, a superheroine in DC Comics
  - Laurel Lance (Arrowverse), also known as Black Canary, a character in the television series Arrow who was adapted from the DC comics character
- Larry Lance, a character in DC Comics who is the father of Dinah Laurel Lance
- Sara Lance, also known as White Canary, a character from the Arrowverse television franchise

== See also ==
- Lance (given name)
- Lantz (surname)
- Lanz (surname)
