= Esther Lanz =

American politician (born 1899)

Member of the Washington House of Representatives from the 27th district
- In office 1932–1936

Personal details
- Born: 1899 (age 126–127) Idaho, USA
- Party: Democratic

Esther M. Lanz (born 1899 in Idaho – unknown) was an American politician. She was a Democrat, representing District 27 in the Washington House of Representatives which included parts of Pierce County, from 1932 to 1936.
