= Christoph Lanz =

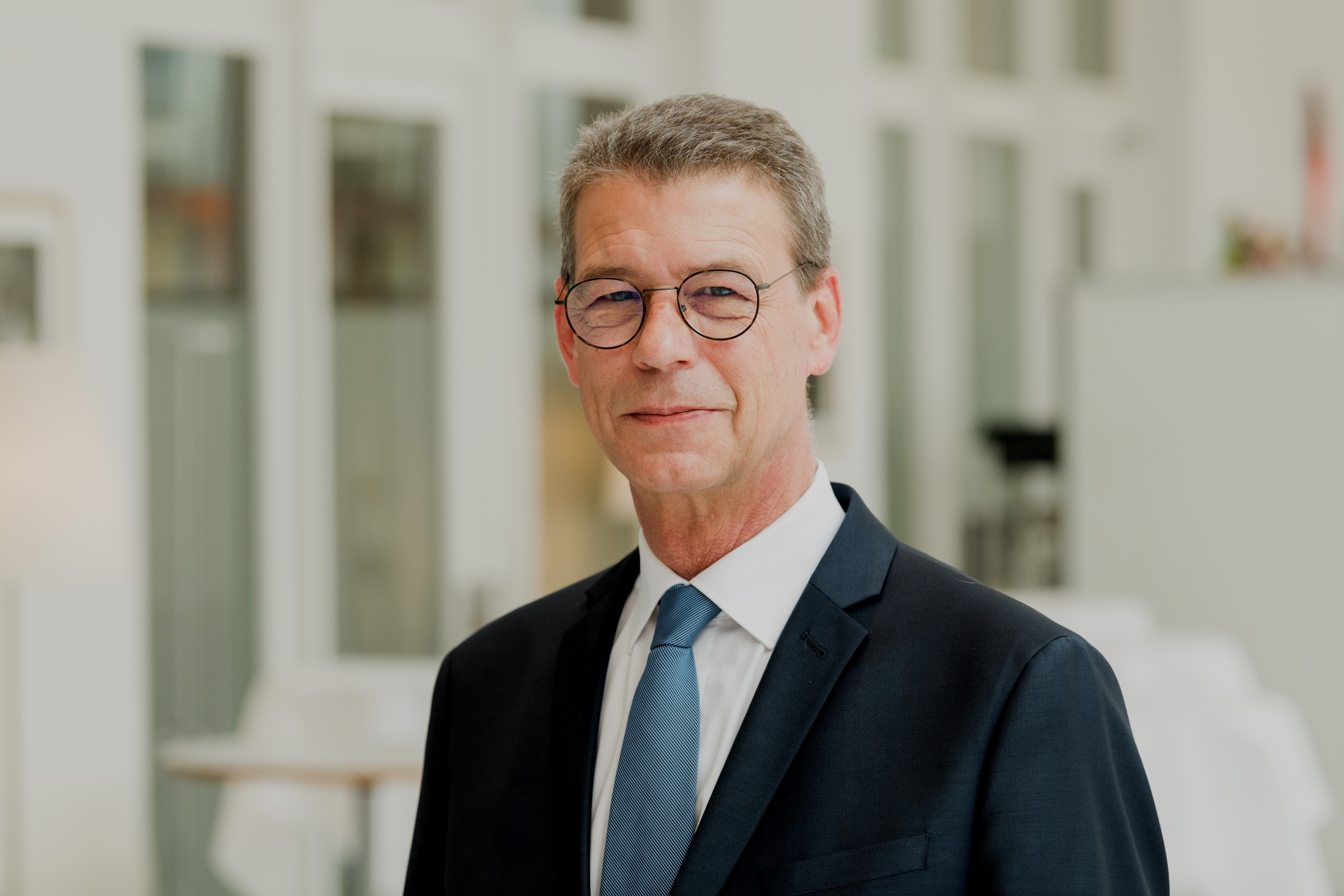
Christoph Lanz

Christoph Lanz (born 1959) is a German journalist and strategic advisor in media development. He is the former Director of Multimedia Global and Director of Television (Program Director ret.) at Germany's international broadcaster, Deutsche Welle. Lanz serves on the jury of the Ulrich Wickert Award for Child Rights (Ulrich Wickert Foundation). Previously, he served as a Trustee of the UK-based Thomson Foundation, Head of the Board of Thomson Media Germany gGmbH, and as a board member of the M100 Sanssouci Colloquium in Potsdam.

== Life ==
Lanz was born in Darmstadt. He has started in journalism in the early 80s as a reporter and editor for Suedwestfunk (SWF) a member of ARD (broadcaster), Germany's nationwide public service broadcasting cooperation. Christoph Lanz has also worked for various television and radio stations including SWF and NDR and was a freelancing correspondent in New York, New York for various ARD stations and RTL, Luxembourg.
1985 to 1989 he worked for RIAS, Rundfunk im amerikanischen Sektor radio-station in various positions. In 1987 Lanz was co-organizer of the RIAS, Rundfunk im amerikanischen Sektor, radio broadcast and emcee of the "Concert for Berlin" at the Reichstag. In the course of this three-day concert there were conflicts between East German youths and the Volkspolizei (GDR People's Police) at the Berlin Wall around the Brandenburg Gate with hundreds of arrests. For the first time there were also calls to be heard like "Gorbi, Gorbi" and "The Wall must go!”
In the early 90s, Christoph Lanz moved to RIAS Berlin television branch, where, two years later he became Editor-in-Chief. After the political upheaval with the fall of the Wall in Germany and the ensuing disbandment of RIAS TV, Deutsche Welle (Germanys International Broadcasting Service) took over the entity. As Editor-in-Chief Christoph Lanz was responsible for the launch of DW-TV, the German global television service.
Christoph Lanz was appointed Director of Television at Deutsche Welle in 2002. During his twelve years as Deutsche Welle's TV- and Multimedia-Director he was responsible for the launch of the Arabic television service and a Hispanic television program. In this capacity, he interviewed among other heads of state Pope Benedict XVI.
Following his tenure at Deutsche Welle, Lanz served as a Trustee of the Thomson Foundation (UK), Head of the Board of Thomson Media Germany gGmbH. He was also advisory board member of the M100 Sanssouci Colloquium in Potsdam until the initiative concluded in 2025.
He is member of the jury for the annual Ulrich Wickert Award for Child Rights, which honors outstanding journalistic coverage of children's rights and media projects by youth supported by Plan International. Christoph is an honorary fellow of the University of Melbourne.

== Awards ==
=== RIAS Berlin Commission Award ===
2010 Christoph Lanz and Max Hofmann received the RIAS Berlin Commission New Media Award for their documentary "Eingemauert" or "Walled In". This production is an animated reconstruction of the Berlin Wall and the inner German border and was published on the occasion of the 20th anniversary of the Fall of the Berlin Wall.
