= 683 Lanzia =

Minor planet orbiting the Sun

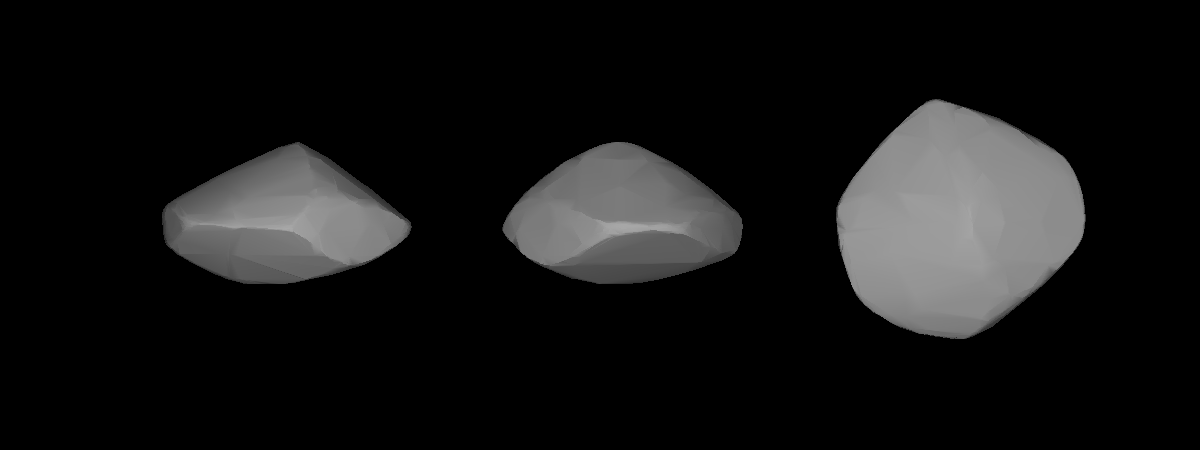
- A three-dimensional model of 683 Lanzia based on its light curve

Discovery
- Discovered by: Max Wolf
- Discovery site: Heidelberg
- Discovery date: 23 July 1909

Designations
- Alternative designations: 1909 HC

Orbital characteristics
- Epoch 31 July 2016 (JD 2457600.5)
- Uncertainty parameter 0
- Observation arc: 101.75 yr (37,164 d)
- Aphelion: 3.2891 AU (492.04 Gm)
- Perihelion: 2.9402 AU (439.85 Gm)
- Semi-major axis: 3.1146 AU (465.94 Gm)
- Eccentricity: 0.056013
- Orbital period (sidereal): 5.50 yr (2007.7 d)
- Mean anomaly: 278.966°
- Mean motion: 0° 10^{m} 45.516^{s} / day
- Inclination: 18.509°
- Longitude of ascending node: 259.724°
- Argument of perihelion: 283.703°

Physical characteristics
- Mean radius: 41.52±11.1 km
- Mass: (7.5±7.5)×10^{17} kg (Note: Calculated from its standard gravitational parameter GM = 0.05±0.05 km^{3}/s^{2}.) (SB441)
- Mean density: 2.5±3.2 g/cm^{3} (calculated)
- Synodic rotation period: 8.630 h (0.3596 d)
- Geometric albedo: 0.1474±0.128
- Absolute magnitude (H): 8.7

683 Lanzia is a minor planet orbiting the Sun. It was discovered July 23, 1909, by Max Wolf at the Landessternwarte Heidelberg-Königstuhl observatory and was named in honor of Lanz, founder of the Heidelberg Academy of Sciences. Photometric observations made in 2003 at the Santana Observatory in Rancho Cucamonga, California, give a synodic rotation period of 8.63 ± 0.005 hours. The light curve shows a brightness variation of 0.15 ± 0.04 in magnitude.

Observations during two last occultation 18 and 22 December 2010 (P.Baruffetti, G. Tonlorenzi - Massa, G. Bonatti - Carrara, R. Di Luca - Bologna (Italy), C. Schnabel - S. Estebe, J. Rovira - Moja (Spain)) measured a 122.5 km diameter (medium) and an Albedo of 0.0705 compatible with carbonaceous asteroids (C group).
