= Ursus C-45 =

Ursus C-45 (C-451)
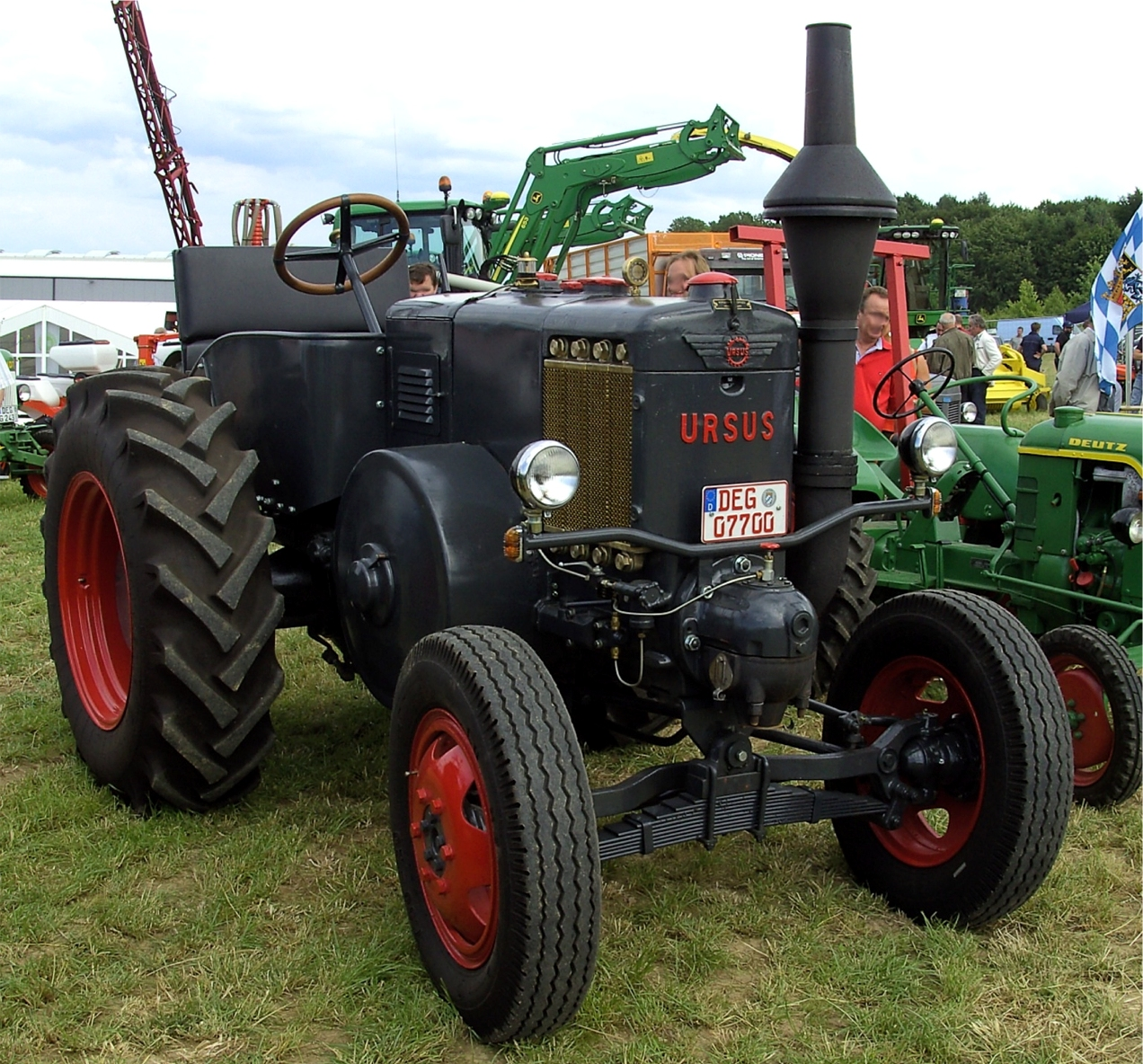
- C-45

Overview
- Type: Agricultural tractor
- Manufacturer: Ursus Factory
- Production: 1947–1959

Powertrain
- Propulsion: Wheels

Dimensions
- Length: 3.4 m (11 ft)
- Width: 1.8 m (5.9 ft)
- Height: 2.3 m (7.5 ft); 2.5 m (8.2 ft) (with cab)
- Curb weight: 3,380–3,680 kg (7,450–8,110 lb)

The Ursus C-45 and C-451 was a popular Polish model of tractor. It was manufactured from 1947 to 1959 by the Ursus Factory in Warsaw, and from 1960 to 1965 by Zakłady Mechaniczne in Gorzów Wielkopolski.

== History ==
Production of the Ursus C-45 model began in 1946. Due to the need to begin production quickly, the Ursus company decided to implement the Lanz Bulldog D 9506 model as their URSUS C-45 because of the war indemnity that Germany was forced to pay by starting the 2nd World War. A part of Germany's war indemnities was the provision of production data and plans of the Lanz-Bulldog. Similar productions or also "copies" of the legendary Lanz-Bulldog are the 'Pampa Bulldog' in Argentina or the 'LE PERCHERON' in France. Examples of this German model were prevalent in the formerly German parts of post-war Poland, left behind following the expulsion of Germans at the end of World War II. Apart from its proximity and prevalence, the model also was advantageously high-powered relative to its simple construction and operation. Technical documentation for the C-45 was completed in July 1946 and was carried out under the guidance of Edward Habich. Under the designation LB-45, Habich built the first prototype in 1947, which was presented at the Labour Day parade in Warsaw on 1 May. Full production of the tractors was launched in September, with 130 units built by the end of 1947.

The C-45 had a one-cylinder, two-stroke engine, with a maximum power of 33 kW (45 hp) and a cylinder capacity of 10,300 cc. The gearbox was 3-speed and the cylinder was placed horizontally. To start the engine, it was first heated by a blow lamp. Then, the steering wheel was removed, along with the column, and slid into one of the flywheels. By then turning the steering wheel, the engine was started. This process required physical strength and skill.

At the beginning of its production life, the C-45 was manufactured with steel wheels. Modernising modifications were made to the tractor in later years, resulting in the improved C-451.

The very first C-45, serial number 0001, worked 12,000 hours without intervening overhaul. Approximately 6,000 C-45 and C-451 tractors were exported to Brazil, China, and Korea.

== C-451 ==
The C-451 was the result of modifications made to the ageing C-45 in 1954. These changes included simplified operation, a more efficient fan, surface-hardened crankshaft, headlight, hydraulic lift, and starting gasoline fuel injection. A metal frame was fixed to the windscreen, rear fenders were fitted, and a canvas cab was added. The production of the C-451 in Warsaw was completed in 1959, with a total construction of 50,000 units.

From 1960 to 1965, the C-451 was manufactured by Zakłady Mechaniczne in Gorzów Wielkopolski, after the technical documentation was passed to them.

== See also ==
- Pampa Bulldog

== Bibliography ==
- Ursus Tractor C-45. Ed. K [onstanty] Chorzewski in cooperation with J. Zagrajka and E. Zgódki. Ed. 3 am and Warsaw 1954 uzup States. Ed. Rol. and Forest
- Zielinski, Andrew (2006). Polish Automotive Structures 1947-1960. Warsaw: Publishing and Communications. pp. 179–183. ISBN 978-83-206-1541-8.
