= Heinrich Lanz AG =

Agricultural machinery manufacturer

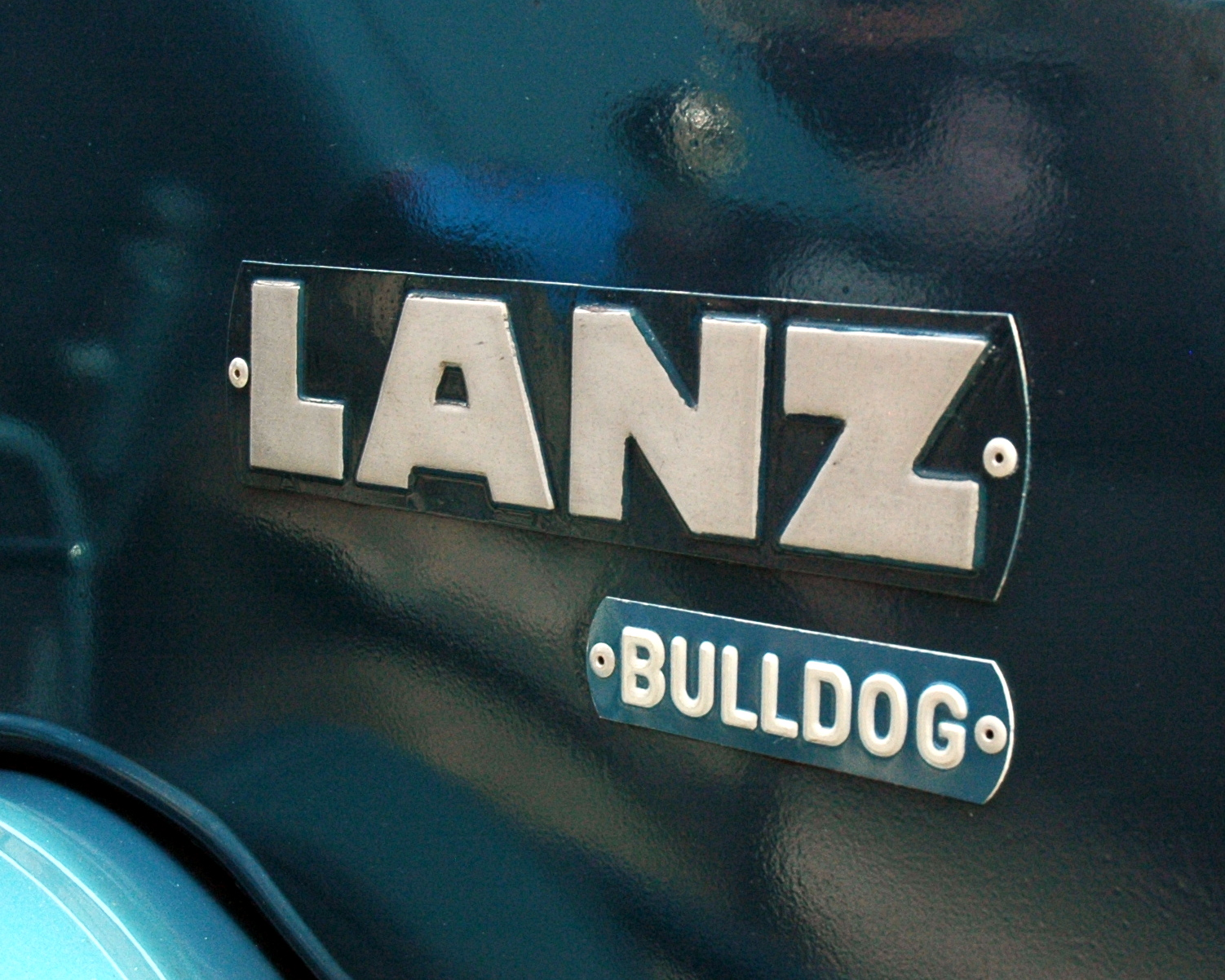
- Lanz logo on a Lanz Bulldog

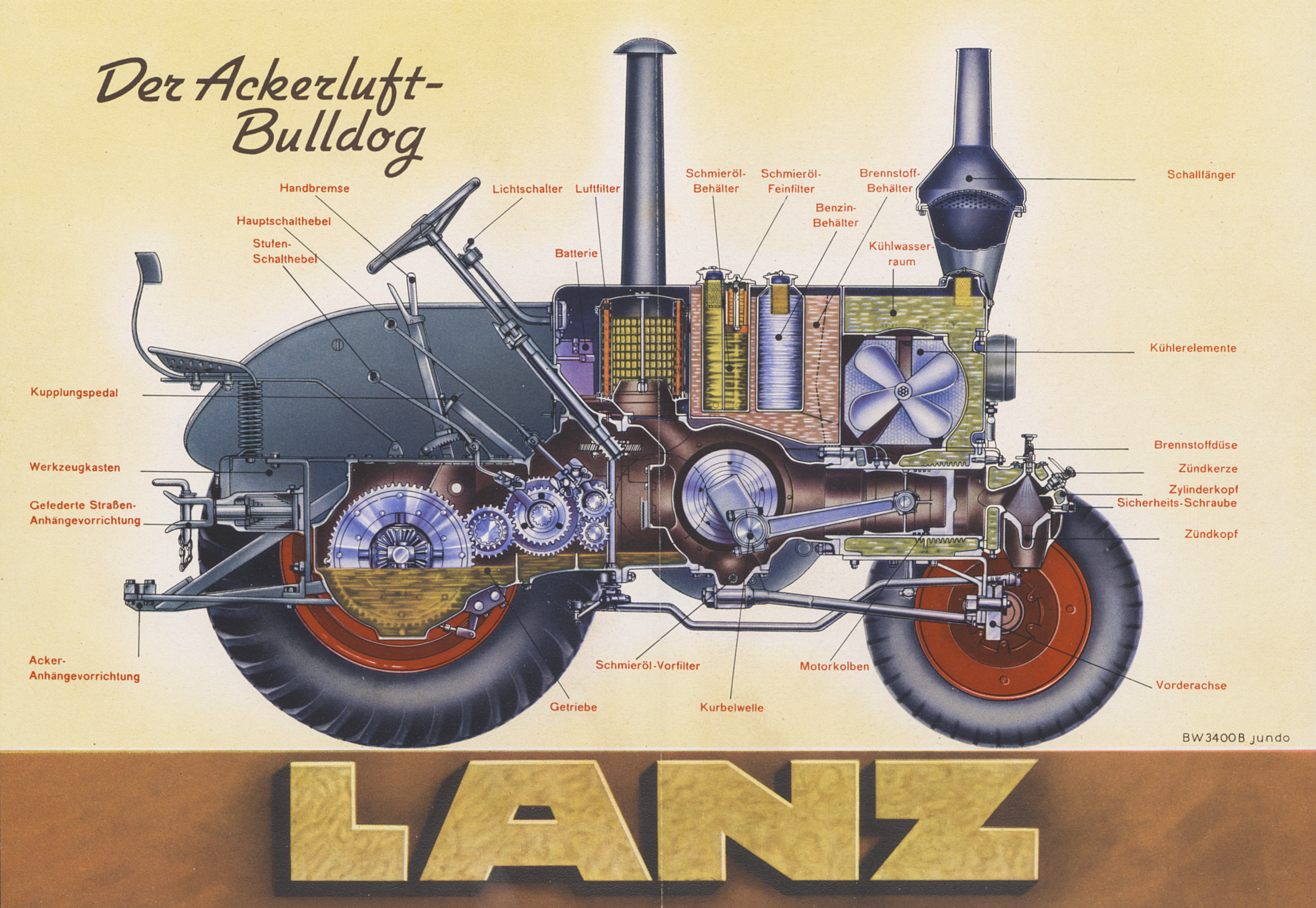
- Schematic view of the Lanz Bulldog
- Type: Aktiengesellschaft
- Industry: Agricultural machinery
- Founded: 1859; 167 years ago, in Mannheim, Germany
- Founder: Heinrich Lanz
- Defunct: 1956; 70 years ago
- Fate: Merged with Deere & Company
- Successor: John Deere Works Mannheim (JDWM)
- Headquarters: Mannheim, Germany
- Area served: Worldwide
- Products: Tractors
- Brands: LANZ
- Services: Agricultural machinery design and manufacturer
- Number of employees: ≈2,200 (1998)

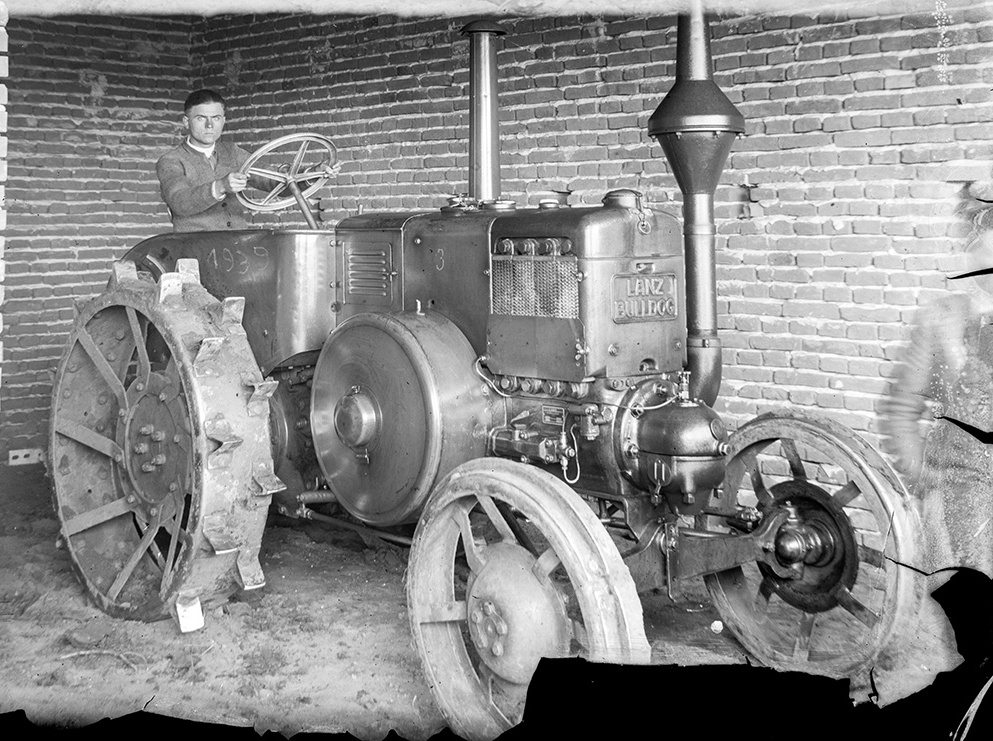
Lanz Bulldog in Romania, 1939

Heinrich Lanz AG is a former agricultural machinery manufacturer from Mannheim, Germany. Its tractors were sold bearing the LANZ brand. LANZ won numerous awards at the Strasbourg Agricultural Fair in 1866; namely four Gold, five Silver, and three Bronze.

The Heinrich Lanz AG company, and its LANZ brand name was ultimately acquired by way of a merger in 1956 by the American agricultural machinery manufacturer Deere & Company, and became the John Deere Works Mannheim (JDWM).

== History ==
The Heinrich Lanz Company was founded in 1859 by German engineer Heinrich Lanz. It produced the first steam-powered stationary threshing machines in 1879, and the first crude oil fuelled tractor; the Lanz Bulldog, in 1921.

In 1956, Heinrich Lanz AG merged with Deere & Company of Moline, Illinois, United States.
