= Lantz (surname) =

Surname

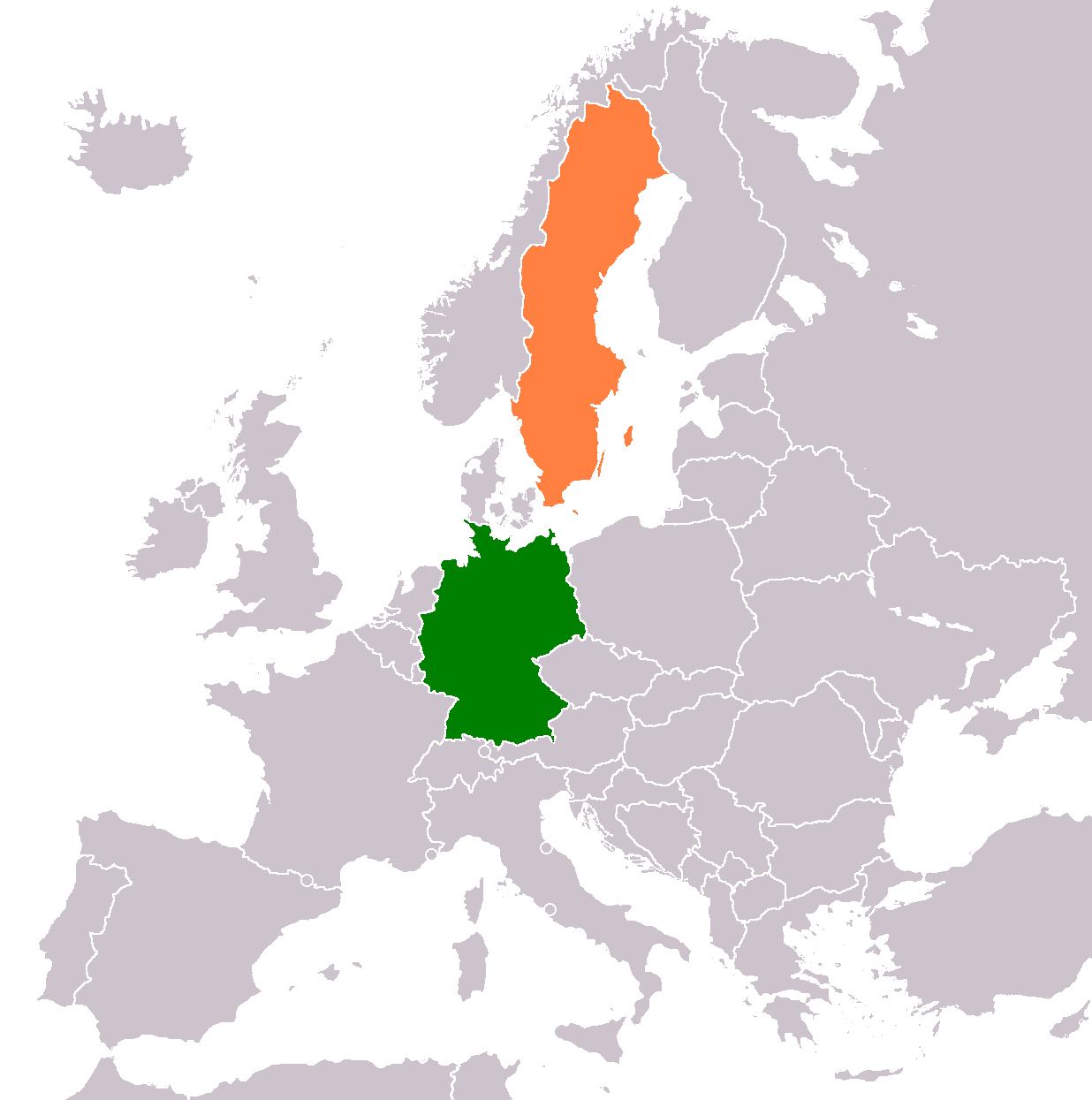
- Germany (green) and Sweden (orange) in Europe
- Pronunciation: lan-ts, lahn-ts, lahns

Origin
- Origin: German, Swedish
- Meaning: "Land," or “Lance”
- Region of origin: Germany; Sweden

Other names
- Variant forms: Lanz, Lanze, Lantze, Lanitz, Land, Lanzo, Lando

Lantz is a surname of German and Swedish origin.

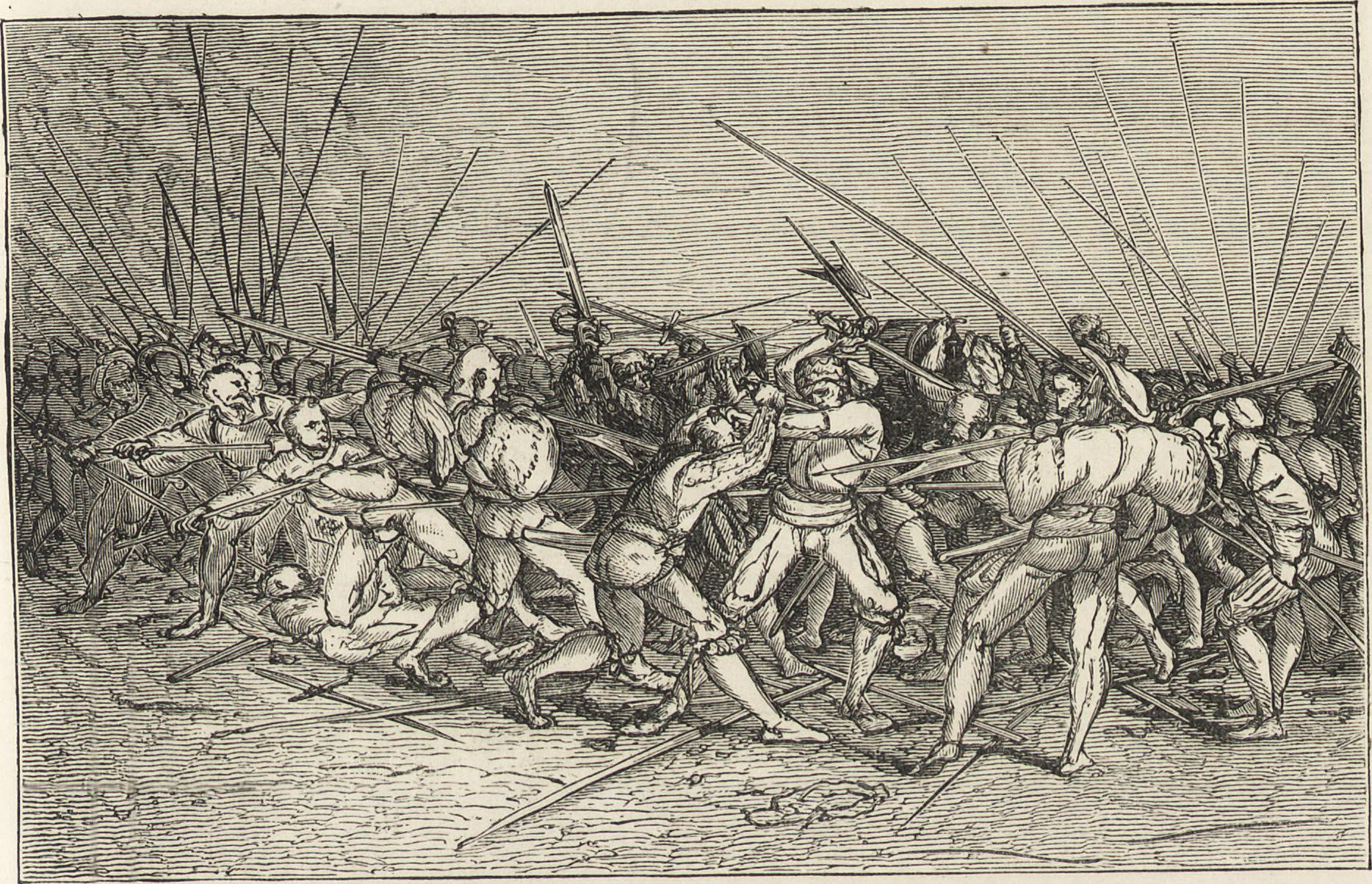
German foot soldiers fighting with lances

== German origins ==
The German surname Lantz is thought to have several origins. It is thought to possibly be a variant habitational surname adopted by people from settlements called "Lanz," a shortened habitational name derived from "Lanzo" or "Lando," which was originally a short form of various compound names using the element "land" or "territory", or possibly derived as a warrior's name from the weapon lance (modern German, "lanze"). Though found throughout Germany, today the surname is most heavily concentrated in the states of Hamburg and Schleswig-Holstein in the north, and Hesse, Rhineland-Palatinate, and Saarland in the southwest. Geographically, it may have originated in the region of Old Saxony.

== Swedish origin ==
The Swedish surname Lantz is thought to have originated as a military-related name derived from "lance," (modern Swedish, "lans") which is a pole weapon designed to be used by a mounted warrior or cavalry soldier called a Lancer. Military-related names became relatively common in the Swedish military in the 17th and 18th centuries as members were required to adopt unique surnames as a means to distinguish themselves from one another.

== German Variants ==
- Lanz
- Lanze
- Lantze
- Lanitz
- Land
- Lanzo
- Lando

== Notable people with the surname ==
- Adolf Lantz (1882–1949), Austrian screenwriter
- Annika Lantz (born 1968), Swedish radio host, comedian and television presenter
- Charles Lantz (1884–1962), American football coach
- Francess Lantz (1952–2004), American fiction writer
- Frank Lantz (born 1963), Director of the New York University Game Center
- Gustaf Lantz (born 1981), Swedish politician
- James A. Lantz (1921–2014), American lawyer and politician
- Jeff Lantz, Canadian lawyer, judge and politician
- Joachim Lantz (born 1977), Swedish football player
- Jörgen Lantz (born 1943), Swedish actor
- Kenneth Lantz (born 1949), Swedish politician
- Lisa Lantz (born 1987), Swedish football player
- Marcus Lantz (born 1975), Swedish football player
- Maria Lantz, Swedish artist
- Michael Lantz (1908–1988), American sculptor and medalist
- Mose Lantz (1903–1969), American football player
- Patricia Lantz, American politician
- Paula Lantz, American social epidemiologist
- Rick Lantz, American football coach
- Rob Lantz, Canadian politician
- Simon E. Lantz (1872–1952), American farmer and politician
- Stu Lantz (born 1946), American basketball player
- Walter Lantz (1899–1994), American cartoonist and animator; creator of Woody Woodpecker

== See also ==
- Lanz (surname)
- Lance (surname)
